= Dalian =

City in Liaoning, China

Dalian 大连市
- Prefecture-level and sub-provincial city
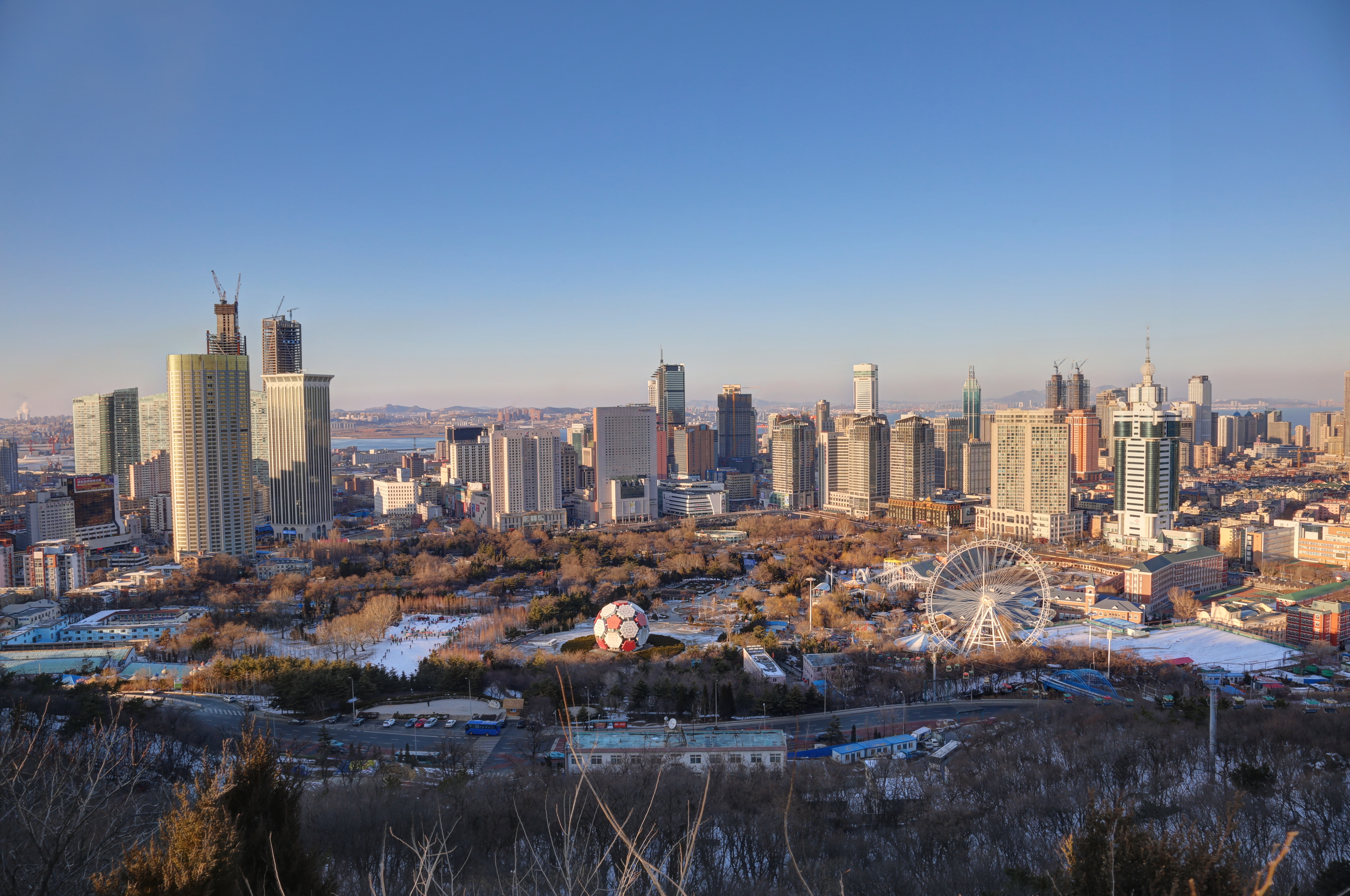
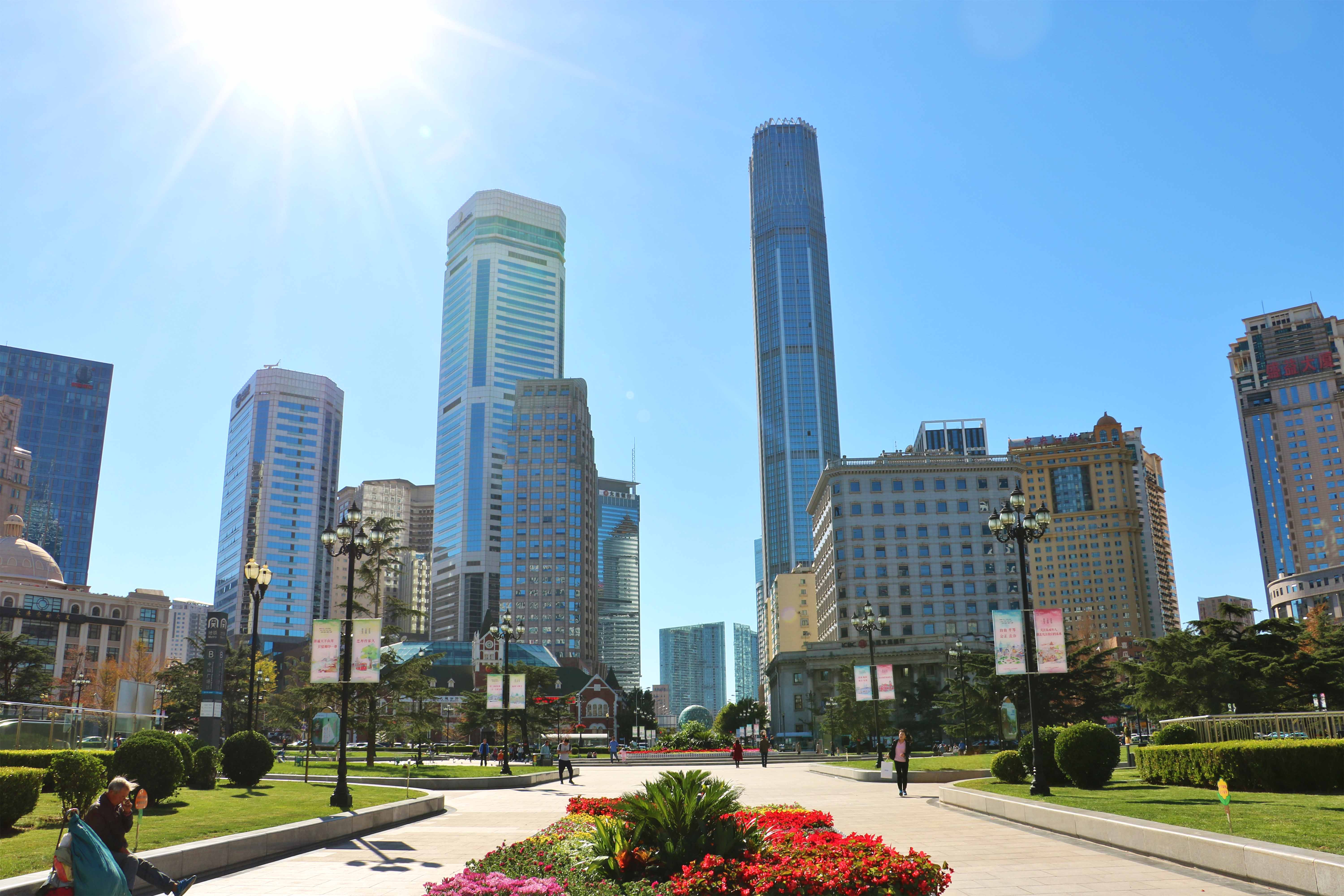
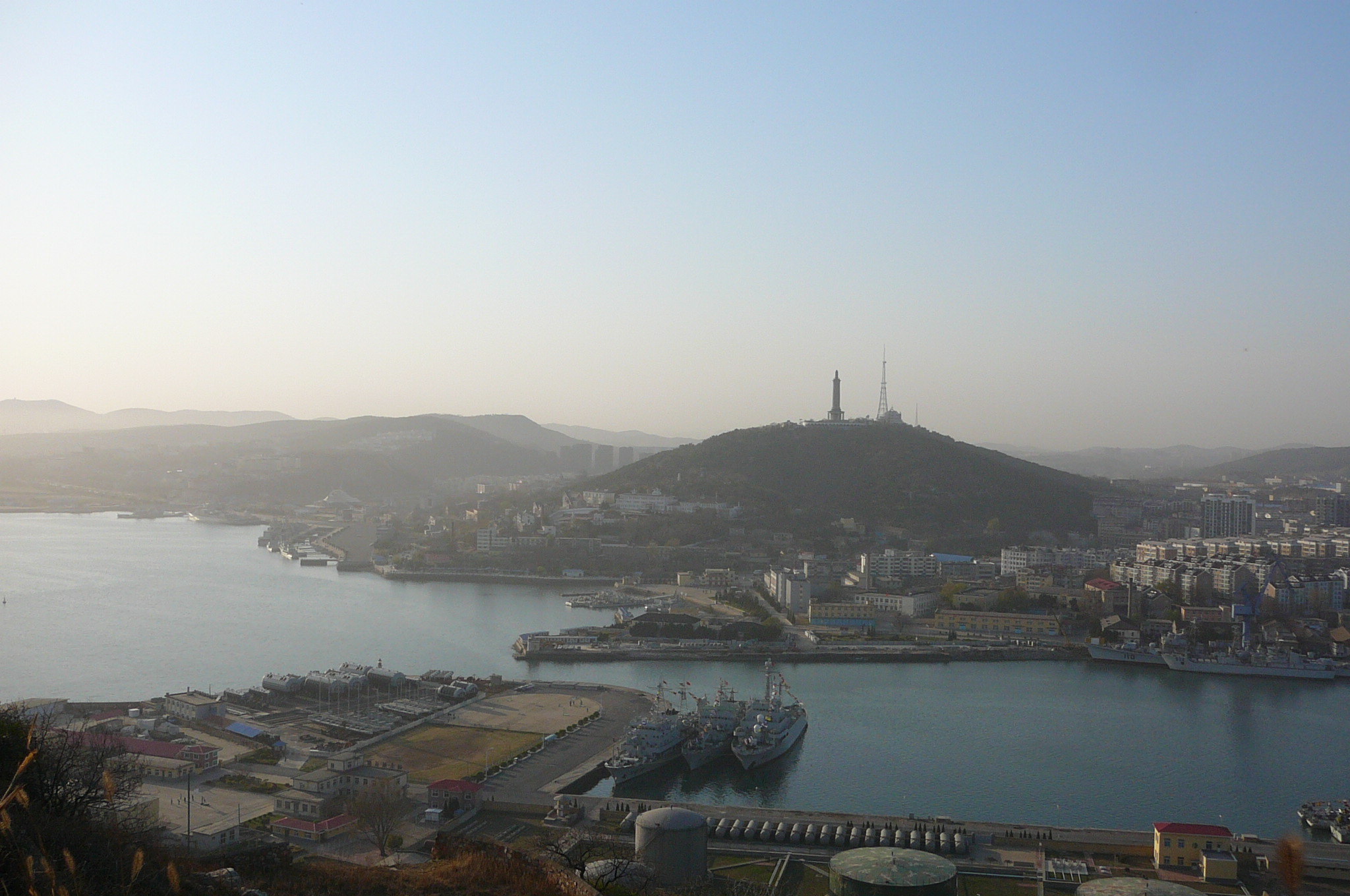
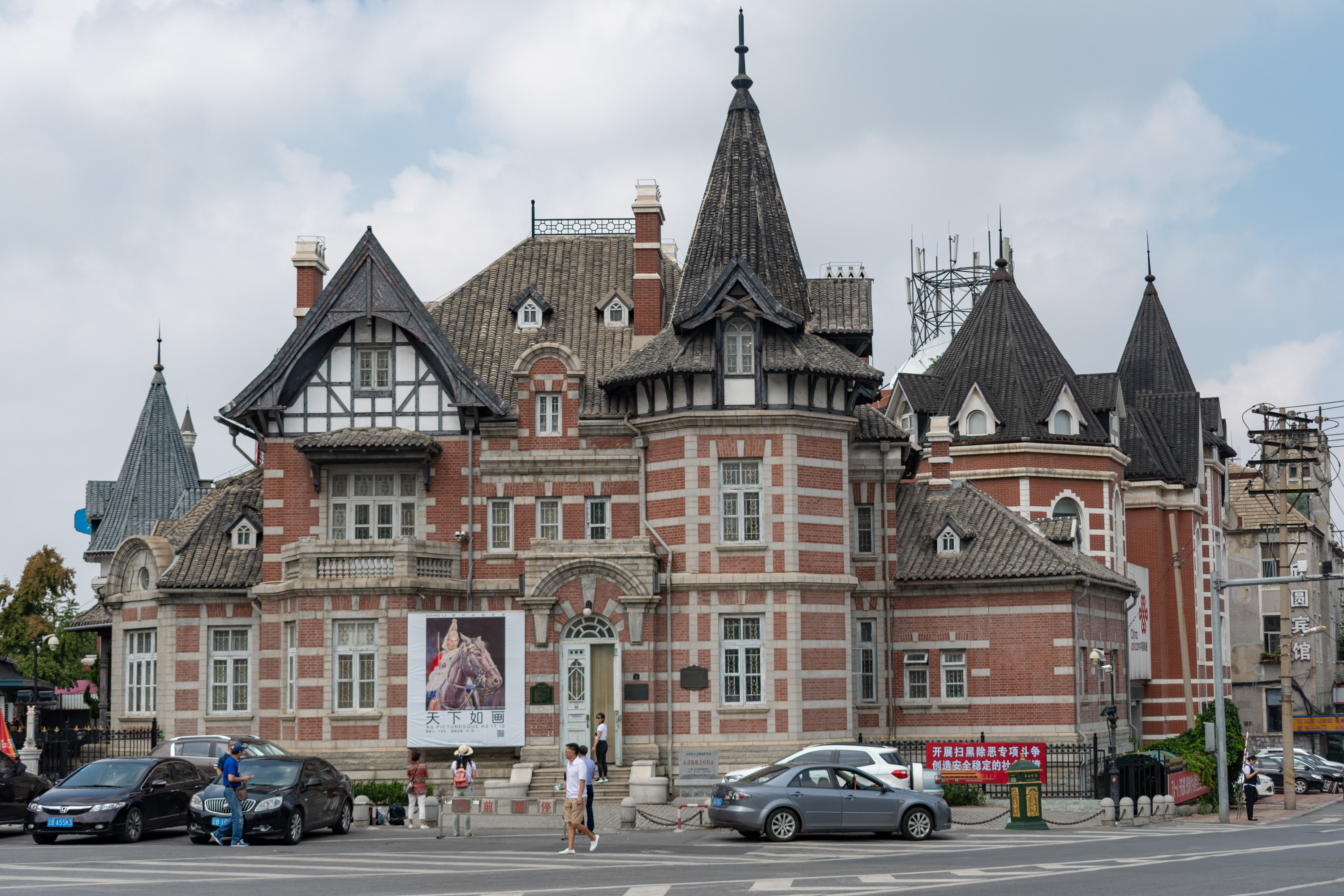
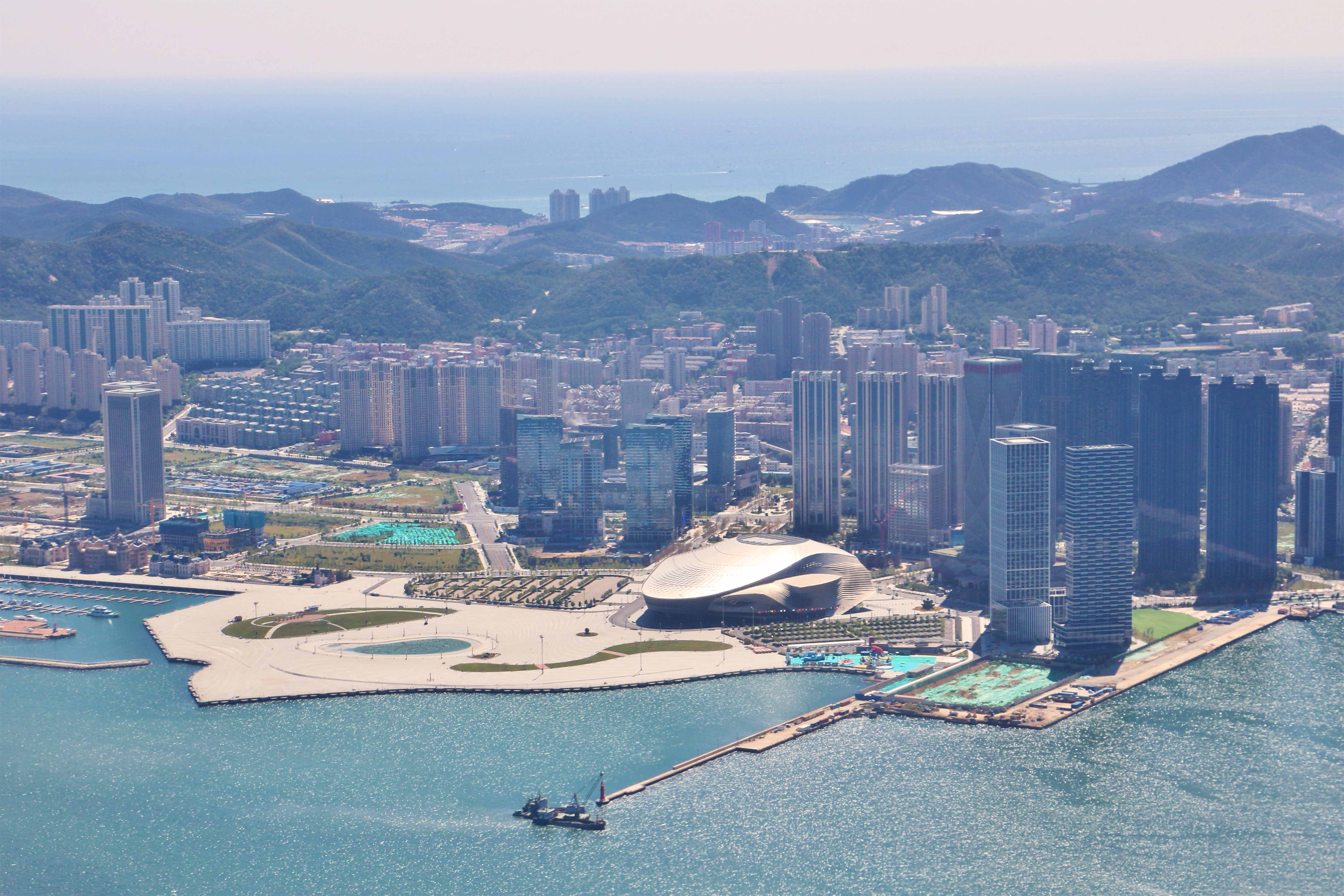
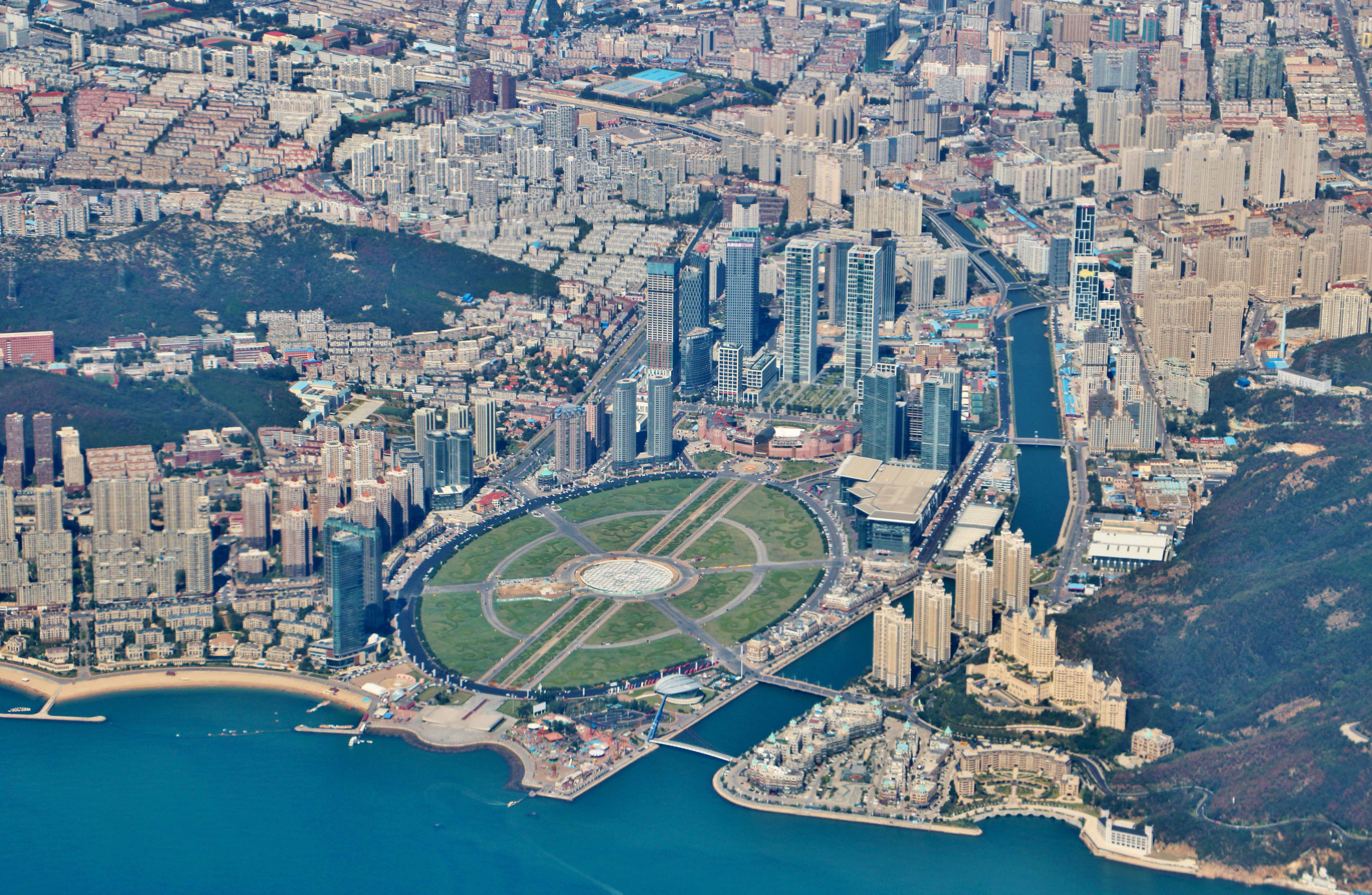
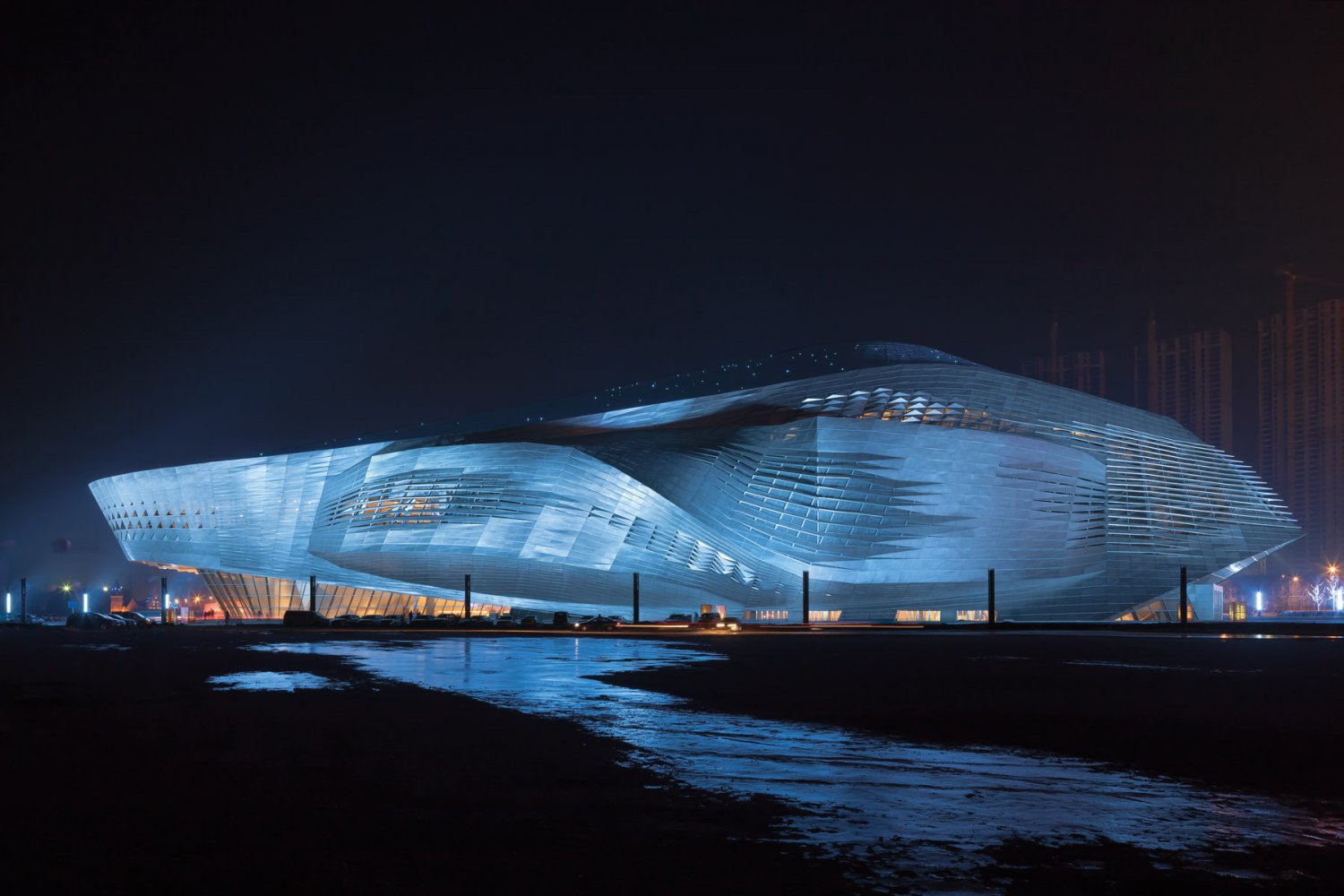
- Labor Park, Dalian Zhongshan Square, Dalian Lüshun Naval Port Dalian Art Museum (Former site of the Russian Town) Dalian East Port Xinghai Square Dalian International Conference Center
- Interactive map of Dalian
- Location of the city center in Liaoning Location of the city center in China
- Coordinates (Dalian municipal government): 38°54′N 121°36′E
- Country: China
- Province: Liaoning
- Established: 1899
- Municipal seat: Xigang District
- County-level divisions: 7 districts, 2 county cities, 1 county

Government
  - Type: Sub-provincial city
  - Body: Dalian Municipal People's Congress
  - CCP Secretary: Li Qiang
  - Congress Chairman: Wang Qiyao
  - Mayor: Yao Huaming
  - CPPCC Chairman: Gong Fuqing

Area
  - City: 13,743 km^{2} (5,306 sq mi)
  - Land: 12,573.85 km^{2} (4,854.79 sq mi)
  - Urban: 5,766.2 km^{2} (2,226.3 sq mi)
  - Metro: 3,169.2 km^{2} (1,223.6 sq mi)
- Elevation: 29 m (95 ft)

Population (2020 census)
  - City: 7,450,785
  - Density: 592.5619/km^{2} (1,534.728/sq mi)
  - Urban: 5,736,383
  - Urban density: 994.83/km^{2} (2,576.6/sq mi)
  - Metro: 5,106,719
  - Metro density: 1,611.4/km^{2} (4,173.4/sq mi)
- Demonym: Dalianese

GDP (2025)
  - City: CN¥ 1,000.21 billion US$ 146.47 billion
  - Per capita: CN¥ 127,743; US$ 17,937
  - Growth: ▲9.51%
- Time zone: UTC+8 (China Standard)
- Postal code: 116000
- Area code: 0411
- ISO 3166 code: CN-LN-02
- Vehicle registration: 辽B
- Division code: 210200
- HDI (2011): 0.86 – very high
- Coastline: 1,906 km (1,184 mi) (excluding islands)
- Climate: Dwa
- Website: www.dl.gov.cn
- Symbols
- Flower: China rose
- Tree: Dragon juniper

Dalian
- "Dalian" in Simplified (top) and Traditional (bottom) Chinese characters
- Simplified Chinese: 大连
- Traditional Chinese: 大連
- Postal: Dalny (1898–1905); Dairen (1905–1945)
- Literal meaning: "The Far-Away"
Transcriptions
Standard Mandarin
- Hanyu Pinyin: Dàlián
- Wade–Giles: Ta^{4}-lien^{2}
- IPA: [tâ.ljɛ̌n]
Wu
- Wugniu: da^{6} lie^{2}
- IPA: Shanghainese: [da˨ li˧]
Yue: Cantonese
- Yale Romanization: Daaih-lìhn
- Jyutping: daai^{6} lin^{4}
- IPA: [taj˨.lin˩]
Southern Min
- Hokkien POJ: Tāi-liân

Lüda (1950–1981)
- Chinese: 旅大
- Postal: Luta
Transcriptions
Standard Mandarin
- Hanyu Pinyin: Lǚdà
- Wade–Giles: Lü^{3}-ta^{4}
- IPA: [lỳ tâ]
Wu
- Wugniu: liu^{4} da^{6}
- IPA: Shanghainese: [ly˨ da˧]
Yue: Cantonese
- Jyutping: leoi^{5} daai^{6}
- IPA: [lɵɥ˩˧ taj˨]

External videos
- Dalian Aerial Photography
- Dalian Aerial Photography by New China TV, 2019.

Dalian (/dɑːˈljɛn/ dah-LYEN) is a major prefecture-level, sub-provincial port city in Liaoning province, People's Republic of China, and is Liaoning's second largest city (after the provincial capital Shenyang) and the third-most populous city of Northeast China (after Shenyang and Harbin). Located on the southern tip of the Liaodong peninsula, it is the southernmost city in both Liaoning and the entire Northeast. Dalian borders the prefectural cities of Yingkou and Anshan to the north and Dandong to the northeast, and also shares maritime boundaries with Qinhuangdao and Huludao across the Liaodong Bay to the west and northwest, Yantai and Weihai on the Shandong peninsula across the Bohai Strait to the south, and North Korea across the Korea Bay to the east.

As of the 2020 census, its total population was 7,450,785 inhabitants of whom 5,106,719 lived in the built-up (or metro) area made of 6 out of 7 urban districts, Pulandian District not being conurbated yet.

Today, Dalian is a financial, shipping, and logistics center for East Asia. The city has a significant history of use by foreign powers for its ports. Dalian was previously known as "Dalniy" (Russian: Дальний; Dal'nii), "Dairen" (Japanese: 大連), and "Lüda" or "Luta" (Chinese: 旅大; pinyin: Lǚdà). The city used to be better known as "Port Arthur" and "Ryojun" (Japanese: 旅順) from the original Port Arthur, now the city's Lüshunkou district.

In 2016, Dalian ranked 48th in the Global Financial Centres Index. In 2012, Dalian ranked 82nd in the Global City Competitiveness Index. In 2006, Dalian was named China's most livable city by China Daily. It is now a Beta-level City under the Globalization and World Cities Research Network classification. The large amount of port traffic makes Dalian a Large-Port Metropolis.

Dalian is one of the top 40 science cities in the world by scientific research as tracked by the Nature Index, ranking 37th globally in 2023. The city is home to several major universities, notably Dalian University of Technology and Dalian Maritime University, members of China's prestigious universities in the Project 211, and the Dalian Institute of Chemical Physics of the Chinese Academy of Sciences.

== Etymology ==
Modern Dalian originated from Qingniwa (traditional Chinese: 青泥窪; simplified Chinese: 青泥洼; pinyin: Qīngníwā; lit. 'green/blue mud swamp') or Qingniwaqiao (青泥窪橋; 青泥洼桥; Qīngníwāqiáo; 'bridge over the green/blue mud swamp'), a small Chinese fishing village. The Russian Empire built a commercial town after coercing a lease of the area from the Qing dynasty in 1898 and called it Dalny (Russian: Дальний, romanized: Dal'nij — "a remote one" or "far-away", in reference to the town's location, rendered in Chinese as 達里尼; 达里尼; Dálǐní) from 1898 to 1905. After the Russo-Japanese War of 1904–1905, Japan occupied the area as the Kwantung Leased Territory and renamed the city Dairen (Japanese: 大連/だいれん), which is the on'yomi (Sino-Japanese reading) of the Chinese name for Dalian Bay (simplified Chinese: 大连湾; traditional Chinese: 大連灣; pinyin: Dàlián Wān) — a name in use since at least 1879. English-language sources called the city Dairen in this period (1905–1945), from Japanese.

In 1950, Dalian, back in Chinese control, merged with the nearby town called Lüshun (traditional Chinese: 旅順; simplified Chinese: 旅顺; formerly Ryojun and before that, Port Arthur) to form the city of Lüda (旅大; Lǚdà), a name (formed from the first syllable of each constituent's name: LÜshun + DAlian) which was usually rendered as Luta in English during that era. In 1981, the Chinese State Council again renamed the city from Lüda back to Dalian (大連; 大连; Dàlián), effective 5 March 1981.

== History ==
=== Ancient ===
In the Qin and Han empires (221 BC – AD 220), the Chinese empire annexed the Dalian Peninsula from the Korean state. During the Sixteen Kingdoms era (3rd through 5th centuries), the Korean state of Goguryeo controlled this region. In the early Tang dynasty (618–907), the Dalian region formed part of Andong Prefecture in Jili state; during the Liao dynasty (916–1125), it was a part of Dong Jing Tong Liaoyang county. Dalian was named Sanshan in the period of Wei Jin (220–420), San Shanpu in the Tang dynasty (618–907), Sanshan Seaport in the Ming dynasty (1368–1644), and Qingniwakou during the early modern era.

=== Qing dynasty ===
In the 1880s, Jinzhou, north of downtown Dalian, now Jinzhou District, was a walled town and a center for political intrigue and economic activity. The Qing government built bridges and heavily fortified the peninsula. Mining camps on the northern coast of Dalian Bay became the small town of Qingniwa (青泥洼) or Qingniwaqiao (青泥洼桥), near what became the downtown core of modern-day Dalian.

=== British, Russian, and Japanese occupations ===
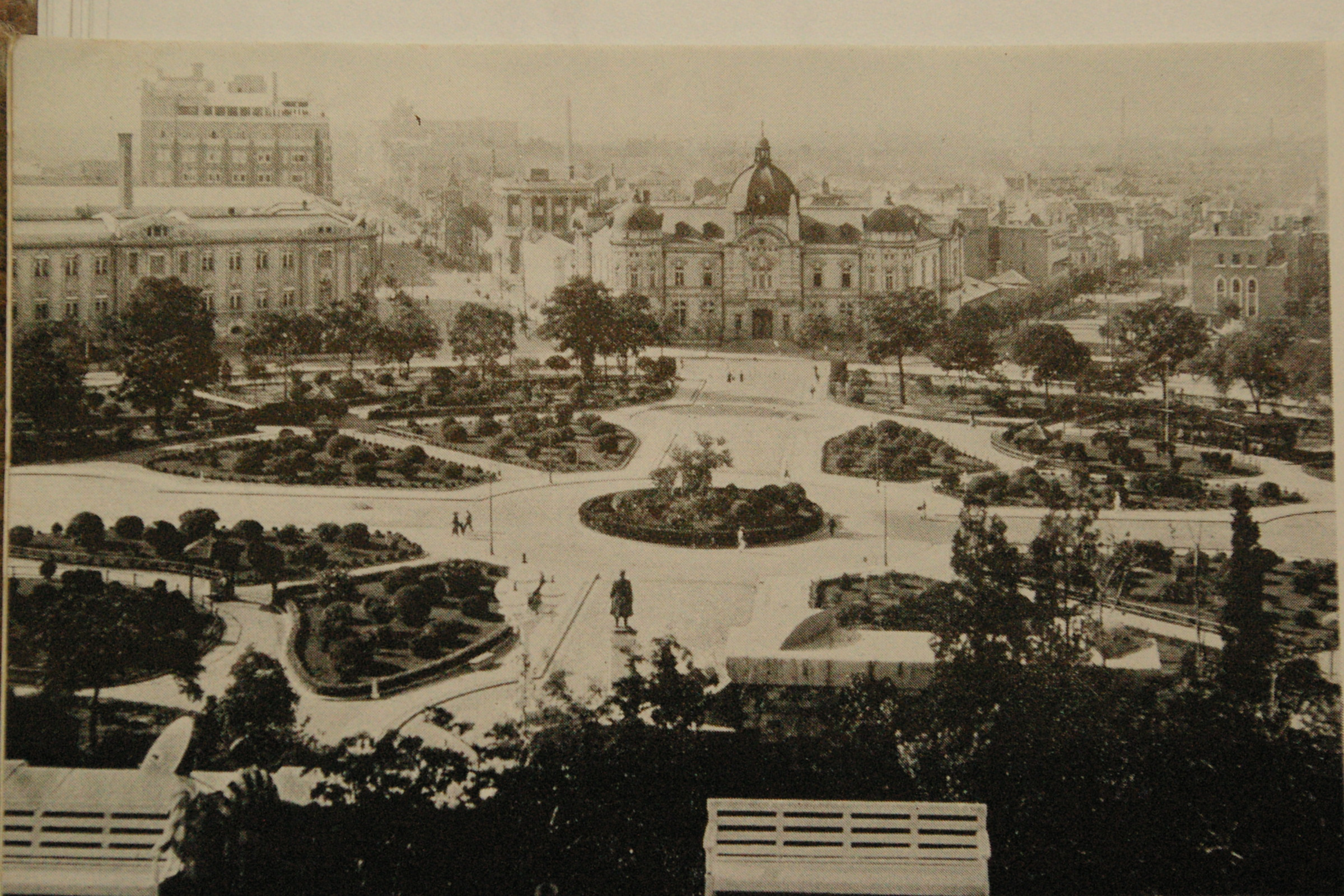
Zhongshan Square, then Ōhiroba (大広場), c. 1940

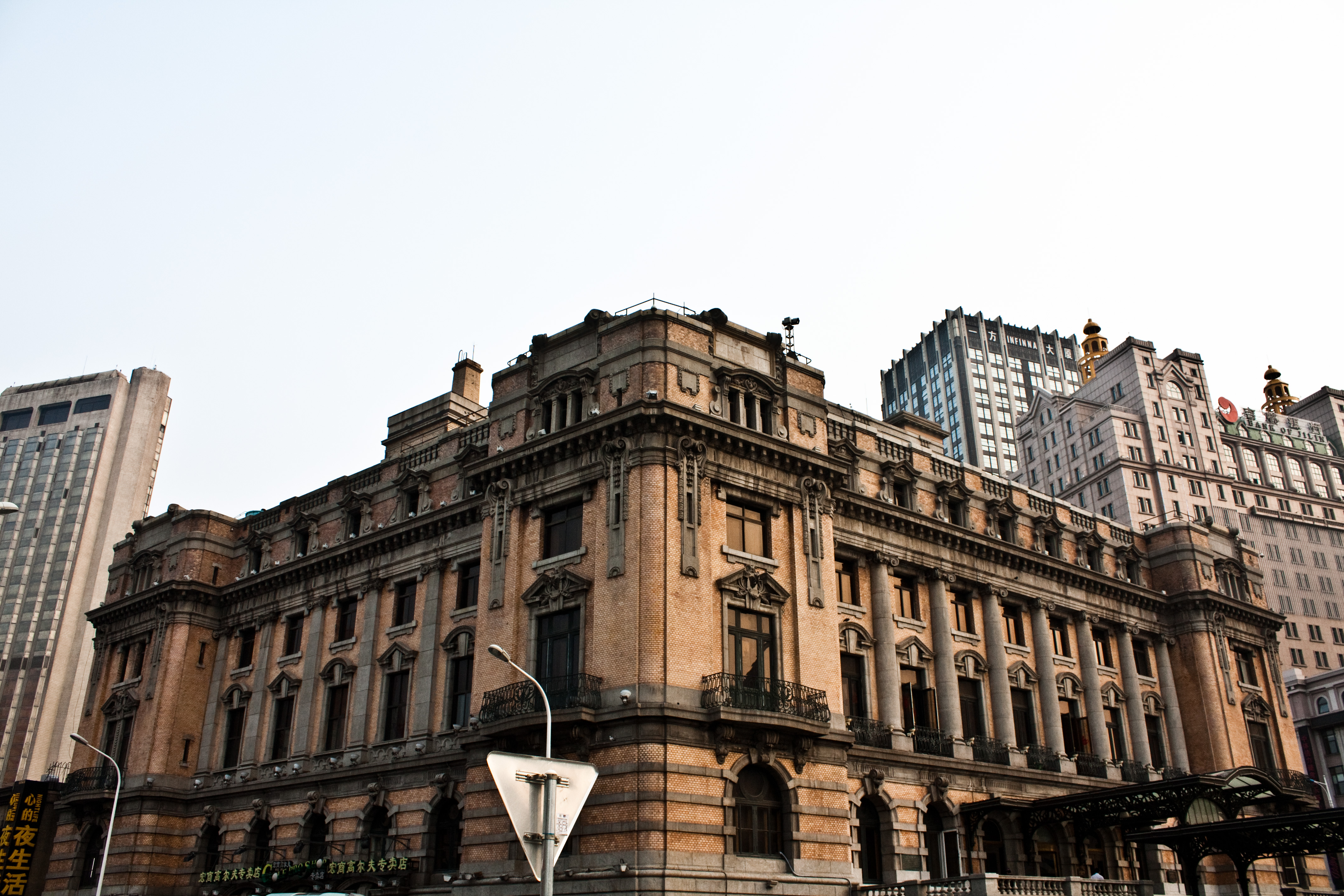
Dalian Hotel, formerly Yamato Hotel, built in 1914

The British briefly occupied Qingniwa during the Second Opium War in 1858, but returned it to Chinese (Qing) control in 1860. Port Arthur at the tip of the Liaodong Peninsula took its English name from Royal Navy Lieutenant William Arthur, though the area's Chinese name had always been Lüshun. Although China heavily fortified the area, which it allowed trade with foreigners, in the First Sino-Japanese War Japan swiftly overcame those defenses and occupied Dalian. In April 1895, China conceded defeat in the First Sino-Japanese War, ceding Liaodong Peninsula, Taiwan, and Penghu, and making many other concessions in the Treaty of Shimonoseki (17 April 1895).

In the Triple Intervention of 23 April 1895, Russia, France, and Germany forced Japan to return the Liaodong Peninsula to China, despite the treaty's terms; instead, the Russian Tsarist regime coerced a lease of the peninsula from China in 1898. Russia had a particular interest in the region of the peninsula as one of the few areas in the region that had the potential to develop ice-free ports. The Russians built a modern commercial port city, which they wanted to become the Paris of the Far East, and called it Dal'niy (Russian: Дальний). Linked by 1902 with the Trans-Siberian Railway via the branch line Chinese Eastern Railway through Harbin, Dal'niy became Russia's primary port-city in Asia while also serving Western traders. Russia signed the Pavlov Agreement (1898) with China, which granted Russia a 25-year lease on Dalian and Lüshun and exclusive right to build a branch of the Chinese Eastern Railway—what would become from 1905 the Japanese-operated South Manchurian Railway. Russia spent more than 10 million golden rubles (equivalent to 11.5 billion of today's rubles) building the new ice-free port city.

Russia heavily fortified both Dalniy (Qingniwaqiao of Zhongshan District) and the Port Arthur naval base (Lüshunkou) before and after the Boxer Rebellion of 1899–1901. During the insurrection, missionaries, converts and Russians were killed and other Europeans were killed by rebels in the peninsula, although the massive massacres of Europeans and Christians including Metrophanes, Chi Sung occurred at Harbin. Western expeditionary forces suppressed the Boxers across the Yellow Sea in Shandong Peninsula.

During the Russo-Japanese War of 1904–1905, the Liaodong Peninsula became a major battleground. Major-General Baron Anatoly Stoessel defended a besieged Port Arthur for five months (August 1904 to January 1905), but the Japanese army, using long-distance fire, sank several Russian ships at the Port Arthur naval base in early December 1904. Admiral Eugene Alexeyeff was blamed for splitting precious resources shipped 8,000 km (5,000 mi) across the single-tracked Trans-Siberian Railway and Manchurian Railway between Dalniy and Port Arthur. After the Imperial Japanese Navy crippled the remaining Russian battleship Sevastopol in three weeks of constant attacks, and explosives detonated in tunnels destroyed Port Arthur's remaining defenses in the final days of 1904, Russia negotiated a ceasefire and surrendered Port Arthur in January 1905.

The Treaty of Portsmouth (signed 5 September 1905) ceded Port Arthur to Japan, which set up the Kwantung Leased Territory or Guandongzhou (關東州), on roughly the southern half (Jinzhou District and south) of present-day Dalian. The Japanese invested heavily in the region, which became the main trading port between Manchuria and Japan. Japan leased the area from Manchukuo after establishing that puppet state in 1932. In 1937, as the Second World War began, Japan enlarged and modernized the trade zone into two cities: the northern Dairen (Dalian) and the southern Ryojun (Lüshun or Port Arthur).

=== Post-World War II ===
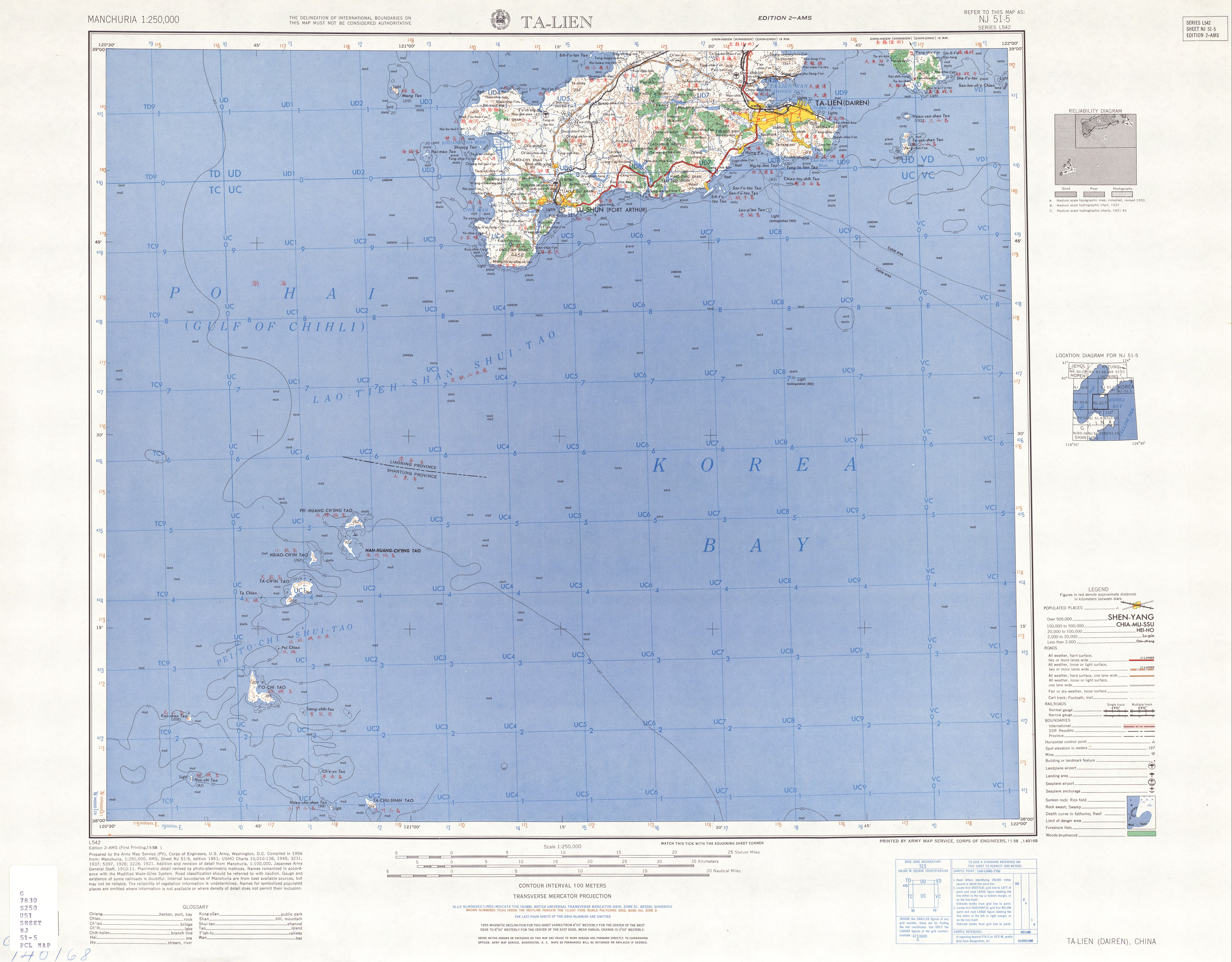
Dalian (labelled as TA-LIEN (DAIREN) 大連) (1956)

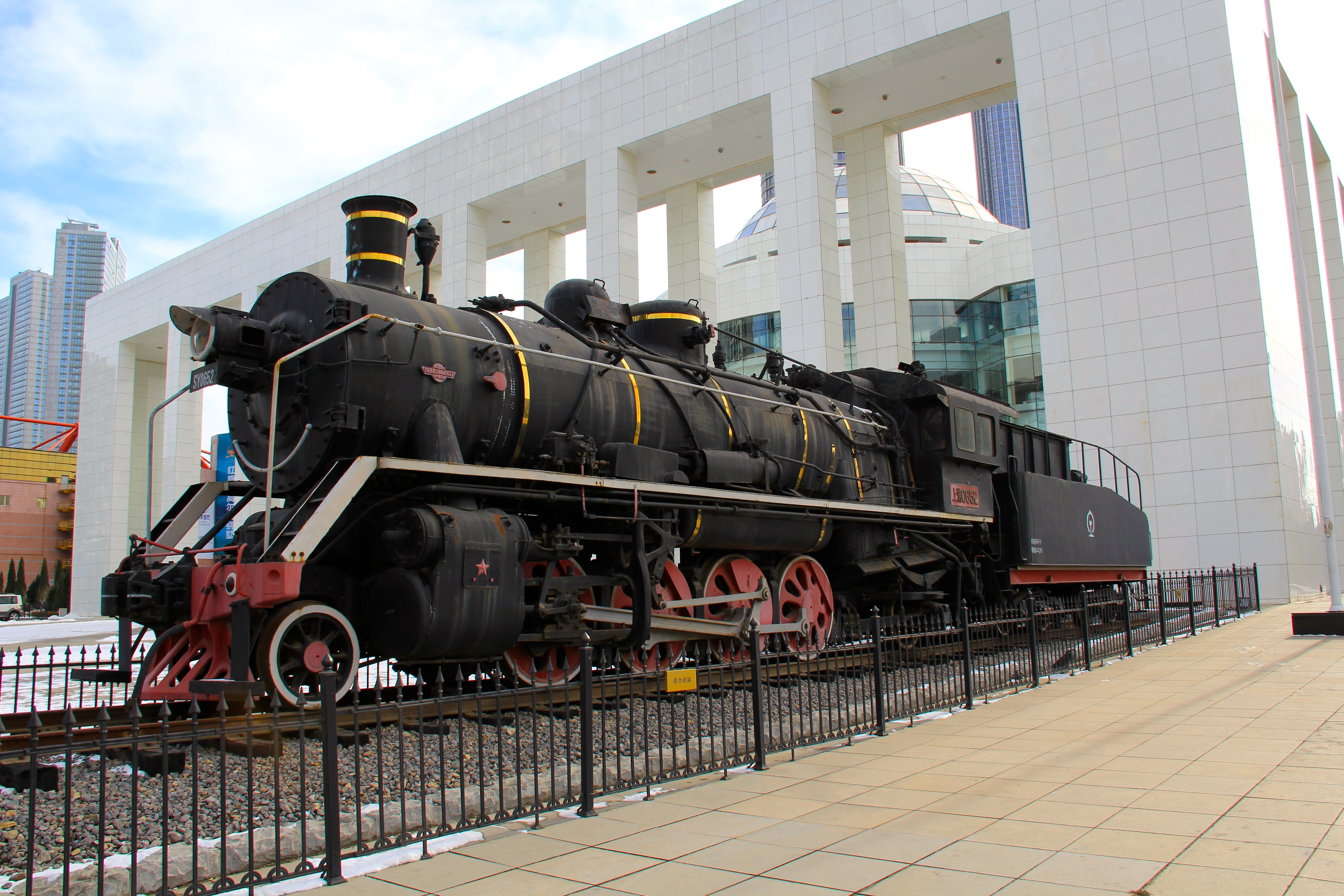
A retired China Railways SY, built jointly by Dalian Locomotive Works and Tangshan Locomotive Works in 1959, on display in front of Dalian Modern Museum

With the unconditional surrender of Japan in August–September 1945, Dairen passed to the Soviets, whose Manchurian Strategic Offensive Operation had liberated the city on 22 August 1945. Unlike many cities in the northeast, the city never reverted to de jure Nationalist authority. The Soviets and Chinese Communists cooperated to develop the city, relatively undamaged during the war, especially its industrial infrastructure and the port. The Soviet government rented the port, and in 1945 the first Chinese Communist mayor of the new Lüda Administrative Office (旅大行政公署) was appointed. The city was a place of relative calm once the Chinese Civil War resumed.

In 1950, the USSR returned the city to Chinese administration without any compensation. Dalian and Lüshun (former Port Arthur) merged as Lüda on 1 December 1950. From 12 March 1953 to 1 August 1954, it was a direct-controlled municipality and not part of Liaoning. Soviet troops left the city in 1955. After the Soviets left, the PRC made Lüda a major shipbuilding center.

In 1981 the city was renamed Dalian, with Lüshunkou becoming a constituent district. In 1984 the Chinese Government designated the city a Special Economic Zone. At the time, Dalian was China's largest foreign-trade port.

=== 1990 to present ===
The city was upgraded from a prefecture-level city to a sub-provincial city in May 1994, with no change in its administrative subdivisions. In the 1990s, the city benefited from the attention of Bo Xilai (Party secretary of Dalian). Bo served both as the mayor of the city and as one of the major leaders in the province; among other things, he banned motorcycles and planted large, lush parks in the city's many traffic circles. He also preserved much of Dalian's Russian Tsarist regime-era buildings. He also worked as the former Minister of Commerce of China.

Since 2007 Dalian has hosted the Annual Meeting of the New Champions ("Summer Davos"), organized by the World Economic Forum, in alternating years with Tianjin. The venue for the forum is the Dalian International Conference Center in Donggang CBD. In 2008 about 1,000 people protested and blocked traffic as a response to the 2008 Tibetan anti-Chinese protests, and forced the temporary closure of the local Carrefour store.

In 2010, one of the worst recorded oil spills in China's history occurred in Dalian. The Dalian PX protest occurred on 14 August 2011. In June 2014, China's tenth state-level new area, the Dalian Jinpu New Area, was officially established. On 5 August 2016, the Dalian huabiao incident occurred. A huabiao, named the "Jiu Long Hua Biao" (九龙华表), in the center of Xinghai Square was demolished, which was believed to be out of political reasons related to the downfall of Chinese politician Bo Xilai, who oversaw the construction of Xinghai Square and the central huabiao during his tenure as the mayor of Dalian. The site of the huabiao was later replaced with a musical fountain, the largest one in Northern China.

== Geography ==
Dalian

Climate chart (precipitation, max. and min. temperature)
J	F	M	A	M	J	J	A	S	O	N	D
8 0 −6	6.7 2 −4	14 8 1	29 15 7	50 21 13	77 25 18	128 27 21	147 28 22	60 24 18	34 18 11	19 10 3	8.4 3 −3
- █ Average max. and min. temperatures in °C
- █ Precipitation totals in mm
- Source: China Meteorological Administration
Imperial conversion
J	F	M	A	M	J	J	A	S	O	N	D
0.3 32 20	0.3 36 24	0.5 46 33	1.1 59 45	2 69 55	3 76 64	5 80 70	5.8 82 71	2.4 76 64	1.3 64 52	0.8 49 37	0.3 37 26
- █ Average max. and min. temperatures in °F
- █ Precipitation totals in inches

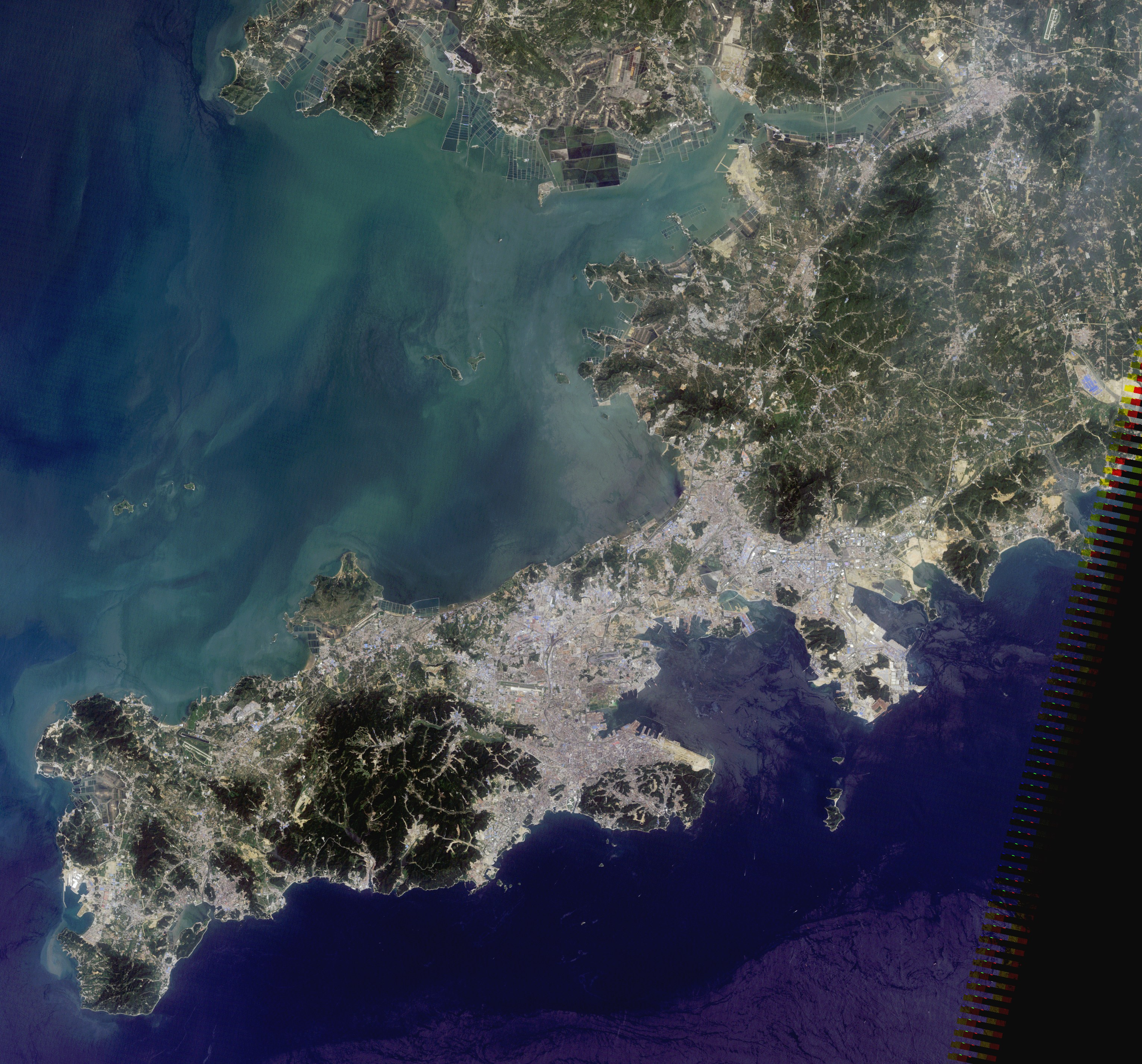
Dalian and vicinities, Landsat 5 satellite image, 3 August 2010

One of the most heavily developed industrial areas of China, the Dalian municipal area today consists of Dalian proper and the smaller Lüshunkou (formerly Lüshun city, known in Western and Russian historic references as Port Arthur), farther along the Liaodong Peninsula. Historical references note that the Russian-designed city of Dalniy (Alt. Dalney), on the south side of Dalian Bay, was 40 kilometers (25 miles) from Port Arthur/Lüshun (known today as Lüshunkou or literally, Lüshun Port).

Dalian is located on Korea Bay north of the Yellow Sea and roughly in the middle of the Liaodong peninsula at its narrowest neck or isthmus. With a coastline of 1,906 km (1,184 mi), it governs the majority of the Liaodong Peninsula and about 260 surrounding islands and reefs. It is situated at south-south-west of the Yalu River, and its harbor entrance forms a sub-bay known as Dalian Bay.

=== Climate ===
Dalian has a monsoon-influenced humid continental climate (Köppen Dwa), characterized by warm, wet summers due to the East Asian monsoon, and cold, windy, dry winters that reflect the influence of the vast Siberian anticyclone. Except for winter, the city experiences a one-month seasonal lag due to its position on the Liaodong Peninsula. The monthly 24-hour average temperature ranges from −3.3 °C (26.1 °F) in January to 24.8 °C (76.6 °F) in August. Annual precipitation averages 580 millimeters (22.8 in) but is heavily concentrated in the summer months and can vary greatly from year to year. Due to the coastal location, the mean diurnal temperature variation annually is small, at 6.66 °C (12.0 °F). The monthly percent of possible sunshine ranges from 45% in July to 66% in March, with 2,625 hours of bright sunshine annually. The annual mean temperature is 11.8 °C (53.2 °F). Extremes since 1951 have ranged from −21.1 °C (−6 °F) on 4 January 1970 to 37.3 °C (99 °F) on 7 August 2026.

Climate data for Dalian, elevation 92 m (302 ft), (1991–2020 normals, extremes 1951–present)
Month	Jan	Feb	Mar	Apr	May	Jun	Jul	Aug	Sep	Oct	Nov	Dec	Year
Record high °C (°F)	10.2 (50.4)	14.2 (57.6)	25.7 (78.3)	28.8 (83.8)	33.8 (92.8)	35.6 (96.1)	36.6 (97.9)	37.3 (99.1)	33.4 (92.1)	28.2 (82.8)	27.0 (80.6)	14.4 (57.9)	37.3 (99.1)
Mean daily maximum °C (°F)	0.0 (32.0)	2.5 (36.5)	8.2 (46.8)	15.1 (59.2)	21.2 (70.2)	25.0 (77.0)	27.3 (81.1)	27.9 (82.2)	24.5 (76.1)	17.8 (64.0)	9.8 (49.6)	2.9 (37.2)	15.2 (59.3)
Daily mean °C (°F)	−3.3 (26.1)	−0.9 (30.4)	4.3 (39.7)	10.9 (51.6)	16.9 (62.4)	21.0 (69.8)	24.0 (75.2)	24.8 (76.6)	21.1 (70.0)	14.3 (57.7)	6.3 (43.3)	−0.5 (31.1)	11.6 (52.8)
Mean daily minimum °C (°F)	−6.0 (21.2)	−3.7 (25.3)	1.2 (34.2)	7.4 (45.3)	13.2 (55.8)	17.9 (64.2)	21.7 (71.1)	22.3 (72.1)	18.2 (64.8)	11.2 (52.2)	3.3 (37.9)	−3.4 (25.9)	8.6 (47.5)
Record low °C (°F)	−21.1 (−6.0)	−17.1 (1.2)	−15.3 (4.5)	−4.2 (24.4)	3.7 (38.7)	10.5 (50.9)	14.2 (57.6)	14.5 (58.1)	6.4 (43.5)	−1.9 (28.6)	−12.8 (9.0)	−19.0 (−2.2)	−21.1 (−6.0)
Average precipitation mm (inches)	5.7 (0.22)	8.1 (0.32)	11.0 (0.43)	34.2 (1.35)	56.4 (2.22)	71.4 (2.81)	120.3 (4.74)	172.0 (6.77)	51.8 (2.04)	37.6 (1.48)	26.2 (1.03)	9.5 (0.37)	604.2 (23.78)
Average precipitation days (≥ 0.1 mm)	2.8	2.9	3.0	5.8	6.6	8.2	10.1	9.2	5.5	5.9	5.3	3.8	69.1
Average snowy days	5.2	3.6	2.1	0.3	0.0	0.0	0.0	0.0	0.0	0.2	2.9	6.8	21.1
Average relative humidity (%)	56	57	53	54	60	73	82	80	69	62	60	58	64
Mean monthly sunshine hours	192.5	191.8	244.3	254.6	274.7	242.8	203.4	222.9	235.5	218.6	172.3	171.6	2,625
Percentage possible sunshine	63	63	66	64	62	55	45	53	64	64	58	59	60
Source: China Meteorological Administration, NOAA all-time extreme temperature

See or edit raw graph data.

== Administration ==
Dalian is the second largest city of Liaoning province, after Shenyang, the provincial capital. The city of Dalian is governed by the Chinese Communist Party Committee of Dalian and the Dalian Municipal People's Government.

=== Municipal government ===
The municipal government is located in the main building on the north side of People's Square on Zhongshan Road, originally built as the Administrative Office of Kwantung Leased Territory, and other buildings in downtown Dalian. There are the Commerce, Foreign Economy & Trade, Health, Information Industry, Police, Religion, Science & Technology, Transportation, and other city-level bureaus, which work closely with the corresponding agencies at the district level.

There are, in addition, 4 national leading open zones (对外开放先导区):

- The Development Zone (开发区)
- The Free Trade Zone (保税区)
- The Hi-Tech Industrial Zone (高新技术产业园区)
- The Jinshitan ("Golden Pebble Beach") National Holiday Resort (金石滩国家旅游度假区)

=== Administrative divisions ===
(see Administrative divisions of the People's Republic of China)

The city administers 7 districts, 2 county-level cities, and 1 county:

- There are 92 sub-districts and 69 towns and townships.
- Zhongshan, Xigang, Shahekou, and Ganjingzi Districts make up the urban core. Changhai County is made up entirely of islands east of the peninsula.

Map
Name	Chinese	Standard Mandarin	Jiaoliao Mandarin	Population (est. 2015)	Area (km^{2})	Density (/km^{2})
City proper
Zhongshan District	中山区	Zhōngshān Qū	Zhong2 san4 Qu4	360,722	40.1	8,996
Xigang District	西岗区	Xīgǎng Qū	Xi4 gang4 Qu4	293,316	23.94	12,252
Shahekou District	沙河口区	Shāhékǒu Qū	Sa4 he2 kou3 Qu4	648,719	34.71	18,690
Ganjingzi District	甘井子区	Gānjǐngzi Qū	Gan4 jinge3 Qu4	843,342	451.52	1,868
Suburban
Lüshunkou District	旅顺口区	Lǚshùnkǒu Qū	Lü3 sun4 kou3 Qu4	221,356	512.15	432
Jinzhou District	金州区	Jīnzhōu Qū	Jin4 zhou0 Qu4	681,543	1,352.54	504
Pulandian District	普兰店区	Pǔlándiàn Qū	Pulan4 dian4 Qu4	915,595	2,769.9	331
Satellite cities
Wafangdian	瓦房店市	Wǎfángdiàn Shì	Wa4 fang4 dian4 Si4	997,830	3,576.4	279
Zhuanghe	庄河市	Zhuānghé Shì	Zuang4 he0 Si4	901,182	3,655.7	247
Rural
Changhai County	长海县	Chánghǎi Xiàn	Chang2 hai0 Xian4	72,033	156.89	459

== Demographics ==
The population of Dalian according to the 2010 census, totaled 6.69 million. The total registered population in households at year end 2014 was 5.943 million, with a net increase of 29,000 over the previous year.

== Economy ==
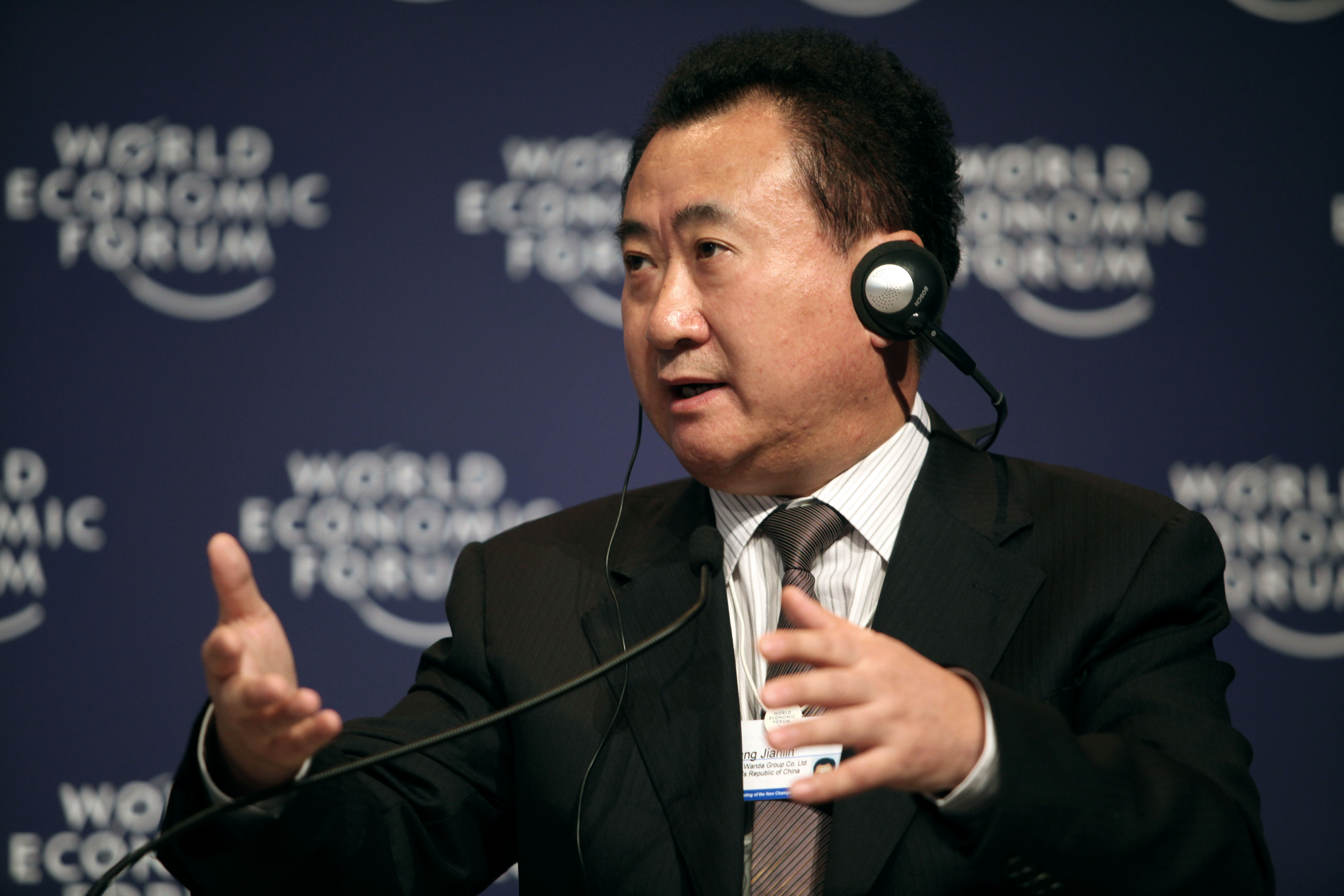
Wang Jianlin, Chairman of the Dalian Wanda Group, at the Annual Meeting of the New Champions of World Economic Forum, Dalian 2009

The city has had a continuous annual double-digit percentage increase in GDP since 1992. In 2014, the city's GDP registered a 5.8% increase, reaching RMB 765.56 billion, while per capita GDP hit RMB 109,939. According to a nationwide appraisal by the National Bureau of Statistics, Dalian ranks eighth among Chinese cities in terms of overall strength. The city's main industries include machine manufacturing, petrochemicals and oil refining, and electronics.

=== Agriculture and aquaculture ===
Dalian was originally an agriculture and aquaculture-based area, which, after the opening of the ferry between Yantai and Lüshun during the early 20th century, began to be populated by the farmers and fishers of Shandong, across the Yellow Sea during the Chuang Guandong era.

=== Heavy, light, and distribution industries ===
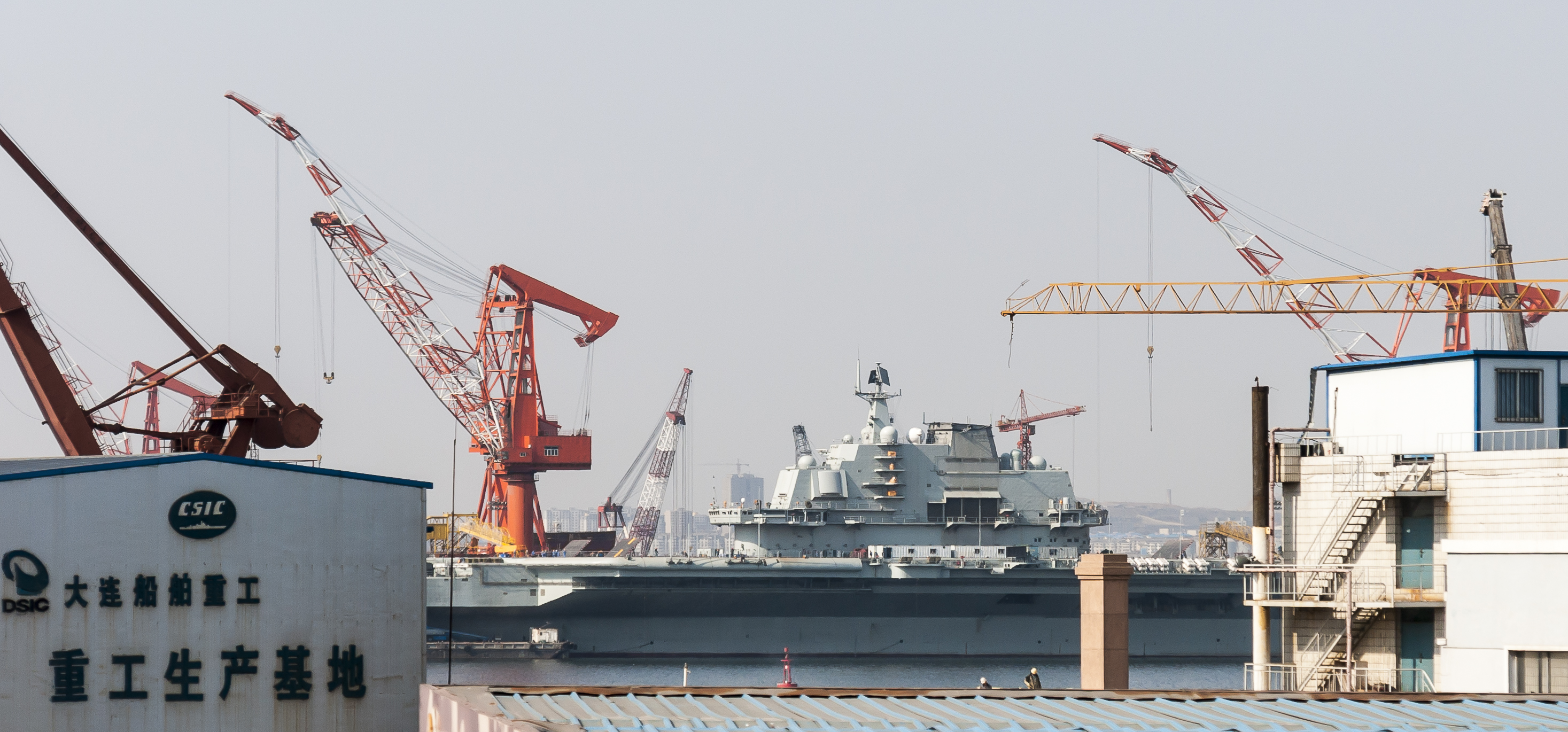
Ex-Varyag undergoing refit in Dalian Shipbuilding Industry Company (2011), which later became China's first aircraft carrier Liaoning

Even before and during the Second Sino-Japanese War, the shipbuilding and locomotives industries were located in the city, such as the companies which later became Dalian Shipbuilding Industry Company and Dalian Locomotive & Rolling Stock Works (DLoco). After WWII, Dalian became an important center of the heavy and light industries, including companies such as Dalian Heavy Industry Co., Dalian Chemical Group, and Wafangdian Bearing Co., and of the distribution industry, such as the Dashang Group.

Dalian Port is an important port for international trade. It has established trading and shipping links with more than 300 ports in 160 countries and regions of the world. There are over 100 international and domestic container shipping routes. A harbor for oil tankers (the largest by tonnage in China), at the terminus of an oil pipeline from the Daqing oilfields, was completed in 1976. Dalian is the 6th largest port in China; and according to AAPA world port ranking data, Dalian is the 8th busiest port in the world by cargo tonnage in 2012, and the 12th busiest container port in the world by total number of TEUs handled in 2013. Accordingly, Dalian is a major center for oil refineries, diesel engineering, and chemical production.

Also completed in 1993 is a newer port called Dayaowan Port (Chinese: 大窑湾港; pinyin: Dàyáowān Gǎng), on Dagushan (大孤山; Dàgūshān) Peninsula in the northern suburbs, specializing in import-export of mining and oil products. Together with the Dalian railway station, Dalian North railway station, Dalian International Airport and two major express roads to Shenyang (Shenda Expressway), Changchun (Changda Expressway), Harbin (Hada Expressway) in the north and to Dandong to the east, Dalian has been an important distribution center.

=== Industrial zones ===
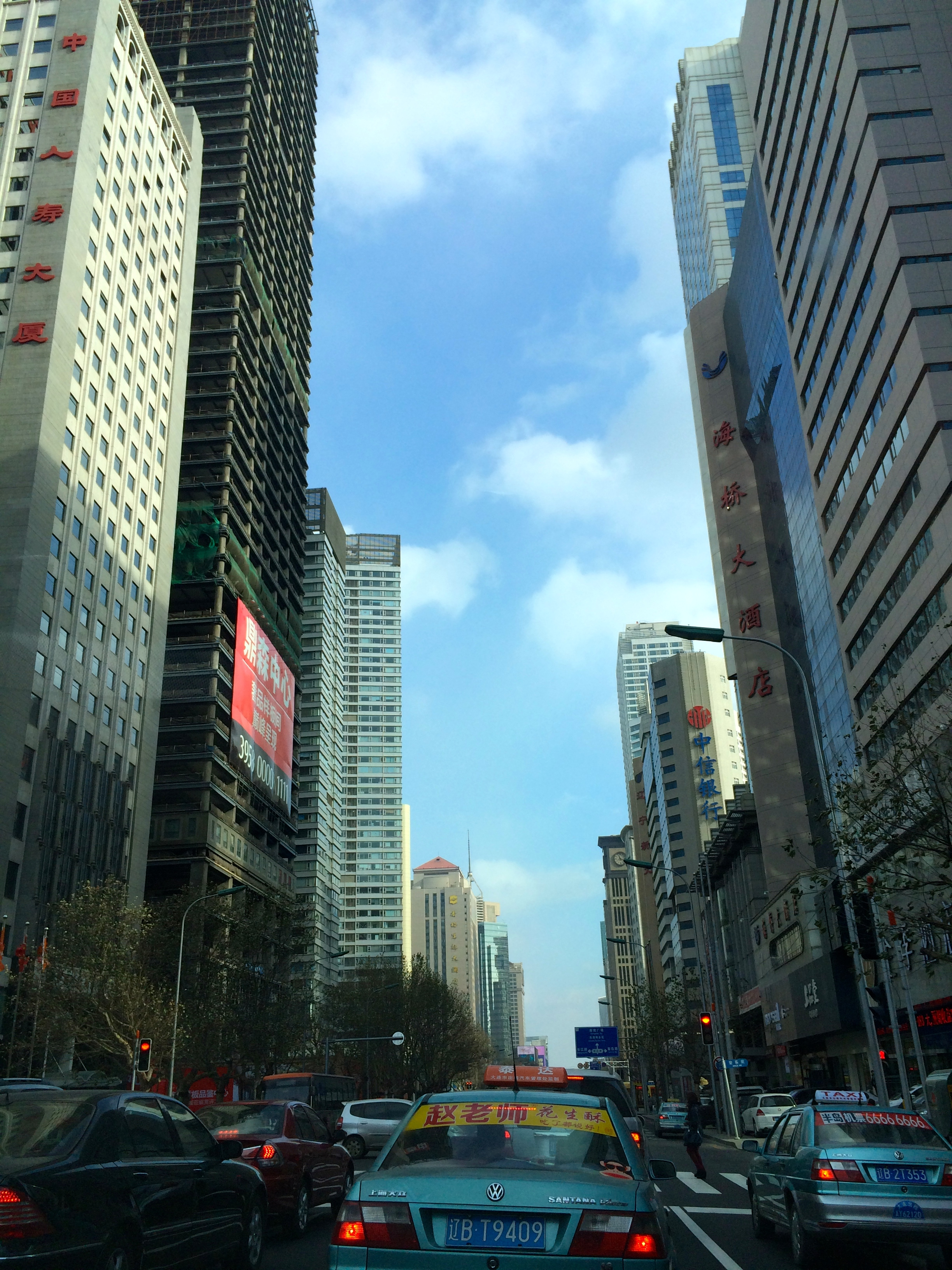
Street view on Renmin Road, Dalian

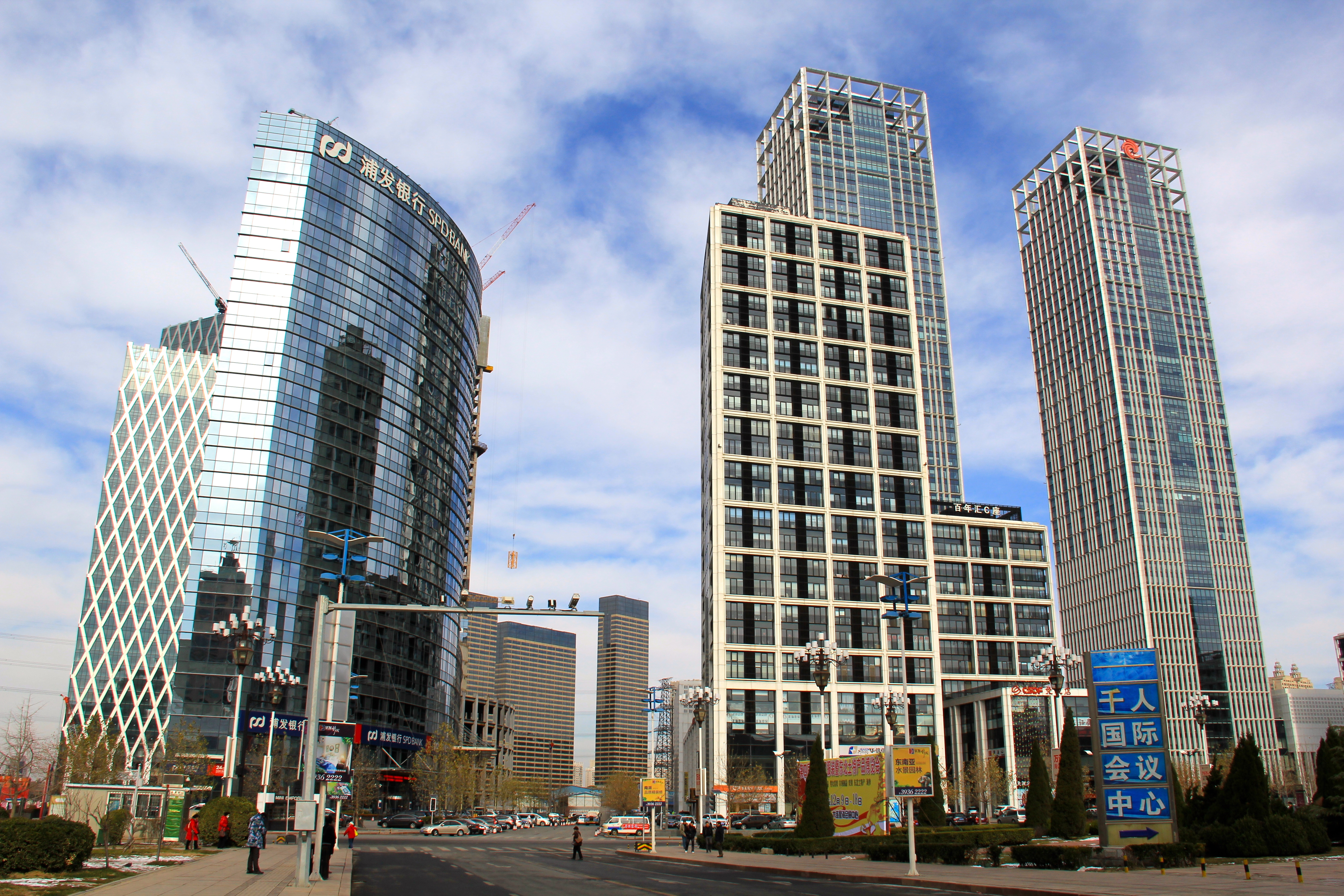
Xinghai CBD houses the headquarters of Dalian Commodity Exchange

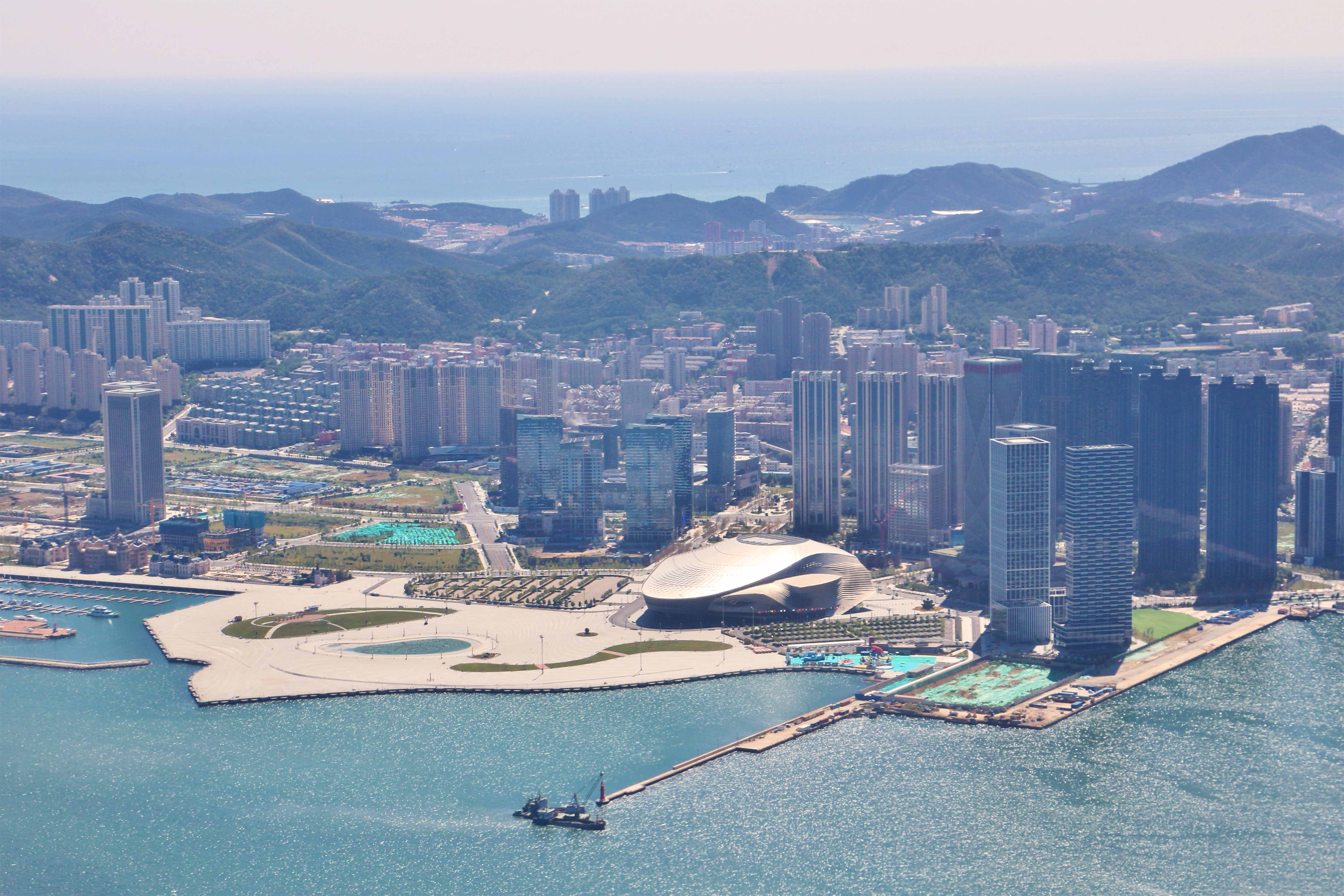
Donggang (Chinese: 东港; lit. 'East Harbour') CBD houses the Dalian International Conference Center

Dalian has been given many benefits by the Chinese government, including the title of "open-city" (1984), which allows it to receive considerable foreign investment (see Special Economic Zone). The Development Zone was established in Jinzhou District, to which many Japanese companies, such as Canon, Mitsubishi Electric, Nidec, Sanyo Electric and Toshiba, followed by South Korean, American and European companies (such as Pfizer). In 2007, Intel announced plans to build a semiconductor fabrication facility (commonly known as a fab) in the Development Zone, Dalian. It is Intel's first fab to be built at an entirely new site since 1992. The facility began operation in October 2010. Dalian also houses auto-manufacturing plants for Chery, Dongfeng Nissan Passenger Vehicle Company, and BYD Automobile (a production base for BYD K9 electric buses).

Other zones in the city include the Dalian Economic and Technological Development Zone, Dalian Export Processing Zone, Dalian Free Trade Zone, and Dalian Hi-Tech Industrial Zone.

=== Financial and IT industry ===
Dalian is the financial center of Northeast China. There are the Dalian branches of China's five major banks: Bank of China, Industrial & Commercial Bank of China, China Construction Bank, Bank of Communications, and Agricultural Bank of China. Dalian City Commercial Bank is now called Bank of Dalian, which, among other things handles processing of the Dalian Mingzhu IC Card for public transportation. Bank of Dalian has opened branches in Beijing, Shanghai and Shenyang, among five other cities.

Founded in 1993, Dalian Commodity Exchange (DCE) is the only futures exchange in Northeast China. The futures industry leaped forward in its development. Among its 19 listed futures products approved by the China Securities Regulatory Commission (CSRC) are corn, corn starch, soybeans, soybean meal, soybean oil, RBD palm olein, polished round-grained rice, linear low-density polyethylene (LLDPE), polyvinyl chloride (PVC), polypropylene (PP), ethylene glycol (EG), ethenylbenzene (EB), metallurgical coke, coking coal, iron ore, egg, fiberboard and blockboard. 3 options are also listed for trading, which include soybean meal, corn, and iron ore options. In 2019, DCE achieved 1,331 million lots and RMB 68.92 trillion, respectively, in trading volume and turnover. According to the Futures Industry Association (FIA) of the U.S., DCE was the 11th largest exchange in the world by trading volume in 2019.

Since the 1990s, Dalian has emphasized the development of the IT industry, especially in Dalian Hi-Tech Zone and Dalian Software Park in the western suburbs near Dalian University of Technology. Dalian High-Tech Zone is the base of high-tech industries, housing more than 4,700 enterprises, including 80 Fortune Global 500 companies. Not only Chinese IT companies, such as DHC, Hisoft and Neusoft Group, but also American, European, Indian and Japanese IT companies are located there, including Wipro, Infosys, IBM, Dell, HP, Ericsson, Panasonic, Sony, Accenture, Oracle, Hitachi and Cisco. Nine professional business incubators are also located in the area, including the Hi-tech Business Incubator, animation and software incubators, with over 400 companies incubated. Currently, the "Lüshun South Road Software Industry Belt" Plan is proceeding, including Dalian Software Park Phase 3.

Intel's Fab 68 is located in Dalian. The plan was announced on 26 March 2007, and operations started on 26 October 2010. It is Intel's first chip-manufacturing fabrication in East Asia.

== Tourism ==
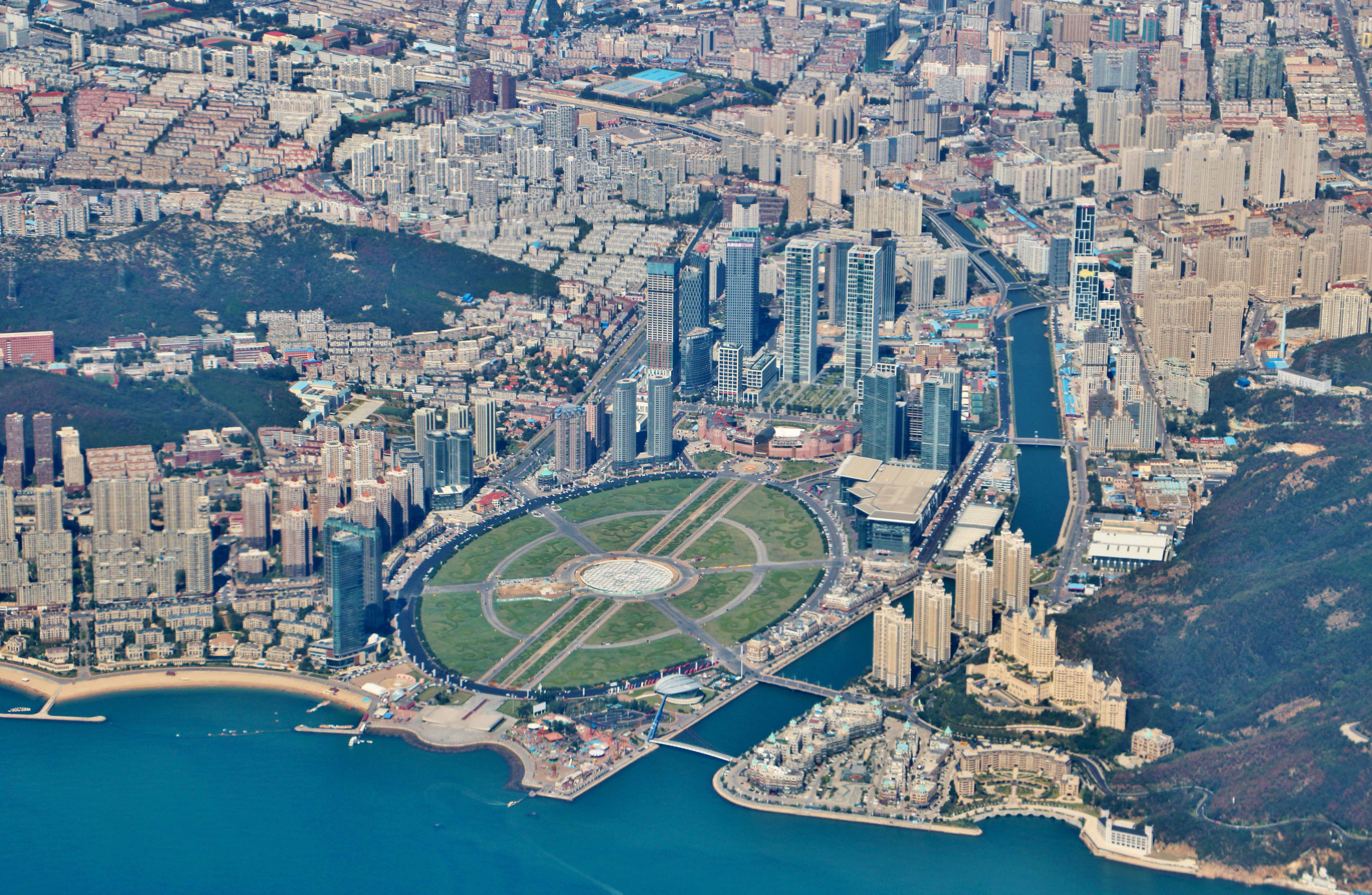
Created entirely through land reclamation, the Xinghai Square is the largest city square in the world

Dalian is a popular destination among domestic tourists and foreign visitors, especially from Japan, South Korea, and Russia. Its mild climate and multiple beaches, as well as its importance in the modern history of China, have attracted tourists. Some of the most famous beaches are Jinshitan Golden Coast (金石滩黄金海岸) beach, Fujiazhuang (付家庄) beach, Bangchuidao (棒棰岛) beach, Xinghai Park (星海公园) beach, Xinghai Bay (星海湾) beach, and Xiajiahezi (夏家河子) beach. In 2007, it was one of the three cities named "China's best tourist city", along with Hangzhou and Chengdu, recognized by the National Tourism Administration and the United Nations World Tourism Organization.

=== Four inner-city districts ===
- Zhongshan Square

Originally designed by Russians in the 19th century, Zhongshan Square (中山广场) is especially noted for the several classical buildings located around the square built during the first half of the 20th century by the Japanese.

- Laohutan Ocean Park: the park contains the Polar Region Marine Animals World, the Coral Aquarium, and the World of Birds. The white whale and dolphin show is a major attraction in the Polar Region Marine Animals World. The Tigers Sculpture Square is nearby, whose tiger sculpture is the symbol of Tiger Beach (老虎滩; Lǎohǔtān). A retired Anshan-class destroyer Taiyuan is open to visitors.

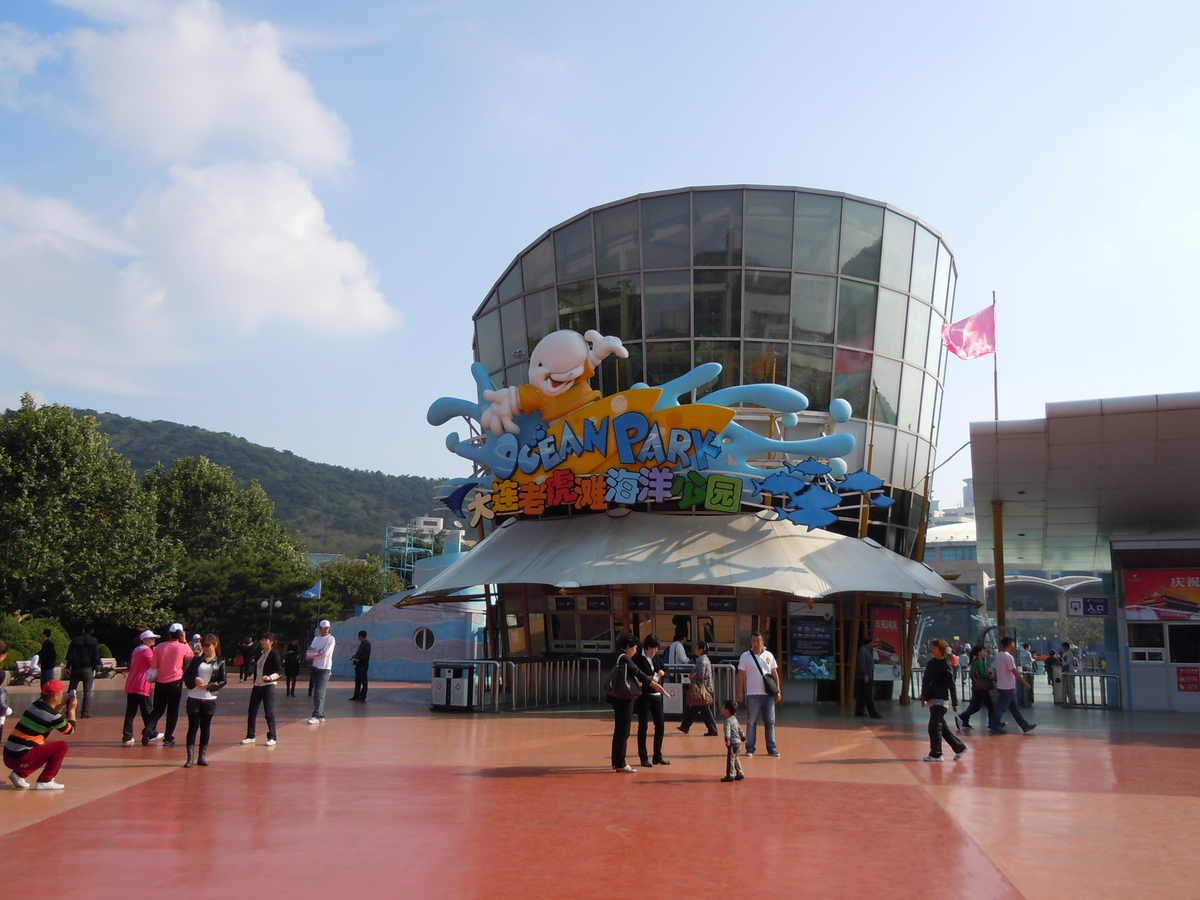
Dalian Laohutan Ocean Park

- Xinghai Square: situated at the Xinghai Bay, Xinghai Square (星海广场; 'Square of the Sea of Stars') was built at the centennial of the City of Dalian (1998) and is the largest city square in the world.
- Heishijiao Geological Park and Dalian Natural History Museum
- Sunasia Ocean World
- Dalian Forest Zoo

Video showing Bangchuidao beach during winter season

- Bangchuidao Scenic Area: a well-maintained park used as a State Guesthouse since 1960, the Bangchuidao Scenic Area is now open to the public with upgraded features including lavish greens, Chinese and Western style villas, hot spring, tennis courts, badminton courts, a recreation center, a golf course and the Bangchuidao beach. The Bangchui Island (棒棰岛; Bàngchuí Dǎo, named for an islet in the shape of an ancient washing tool Bangchui) can be seen from the beach. As a State Guesthouse, the scenic area has received numerous Chinese and foreign leaders and high-profile officials, including Zhou Enlai, Deng Xiaoping, Jiang Zemin, Hu Jintao, Xi Jinping, Kim Jong Un, Henry Kissinger, Boris Yeltsin, Gerhard Schröder, Juan Antonio Samaranch and so on.
- Dalian Sightseeing Tower

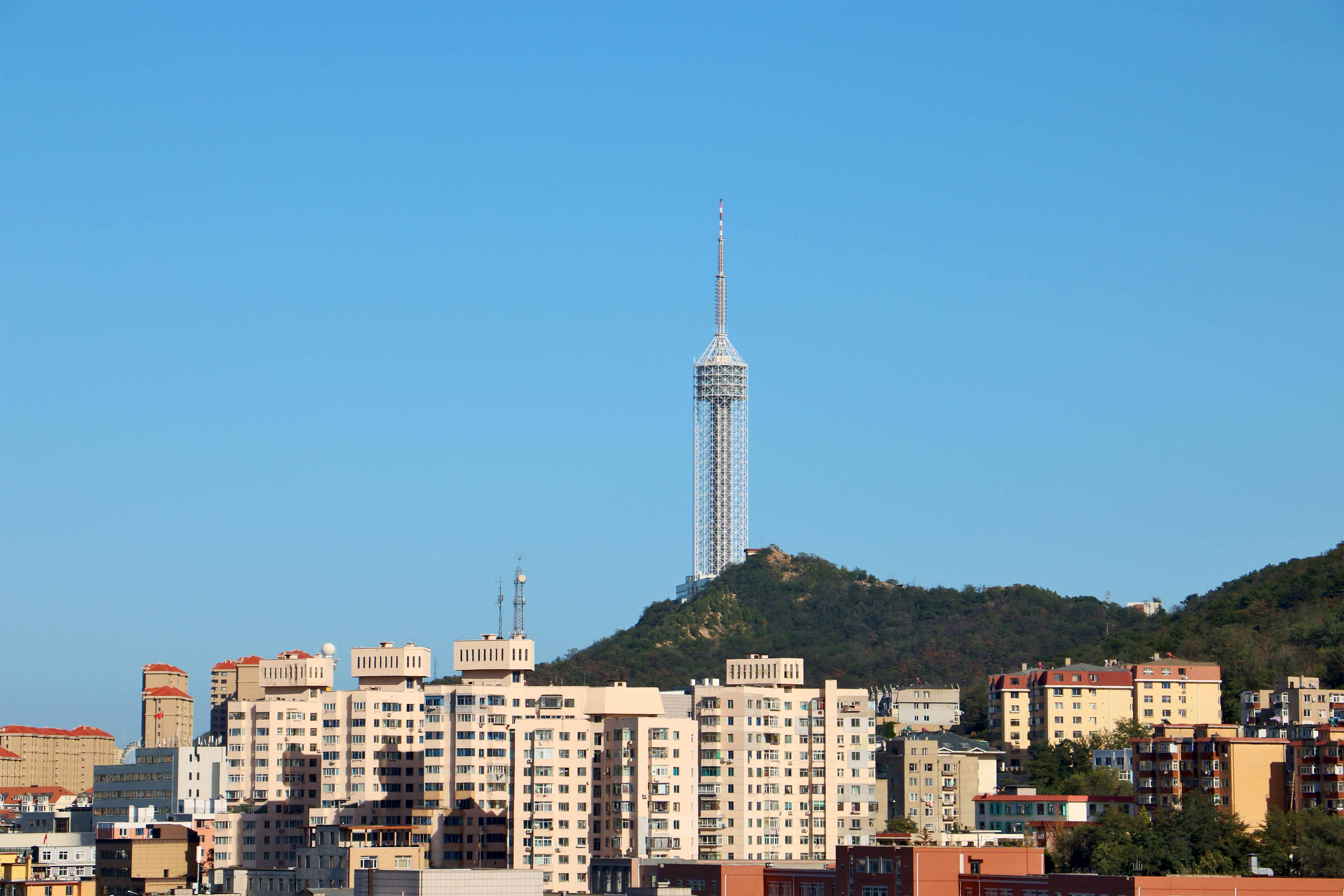
Dalian Sightseeing Tower, formerly Dalian Radio & TV Tower

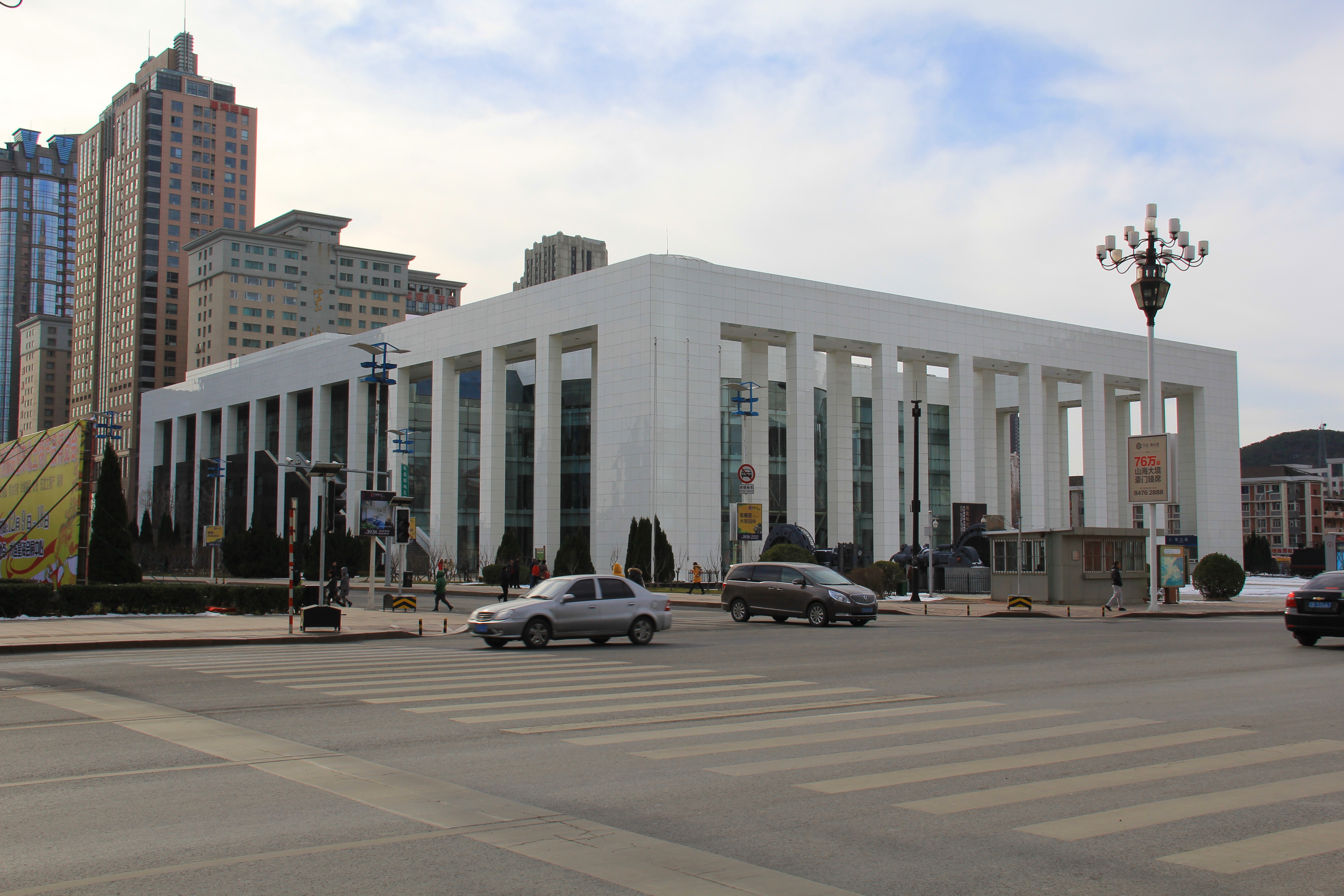
Dalian Modern Museum

- Donggang Music Fountain
- Fujiazhuang Beach

=== Jinzhou District and Development Zone (in the northern suburbs) ===
- Dahei Mountain
- Jinshitan National Holiday Resort and the Discoveryland (Chinese: 金石滩; pinyin: Jīnshítān; lit. 'Golden Pebble Beach') is composed of eastern peninsula, western peninsula, open ground between two peninsulas and the 16-kilometer (10 mi) Golden Coast beach. Major sightseeing points include, Golden Pebble Waxworks Museum, Geological Museum, Coastal National Geopark, International Vehicle Campsite, Tang Dynasty Hot Spring Resort, Golden Rock Park, Wanfuding Park, China Martial Arts Hall, Discoveryland Theme Park, Mao Zedong Badge Exhibition Hall, Model Movie & TV Art Center, Golden Pebble Hunting Club, Golden Pebble Equestrianism Base, Golden Pebble International Convention Center & Resort, Golden Pebble Golf Club, and Golden Gulf Golf Course. Several themed events, such as Dalian International Beach Carnival, International Winter Swimming Festival and Grape Festival, take place in Jinshitan annually.

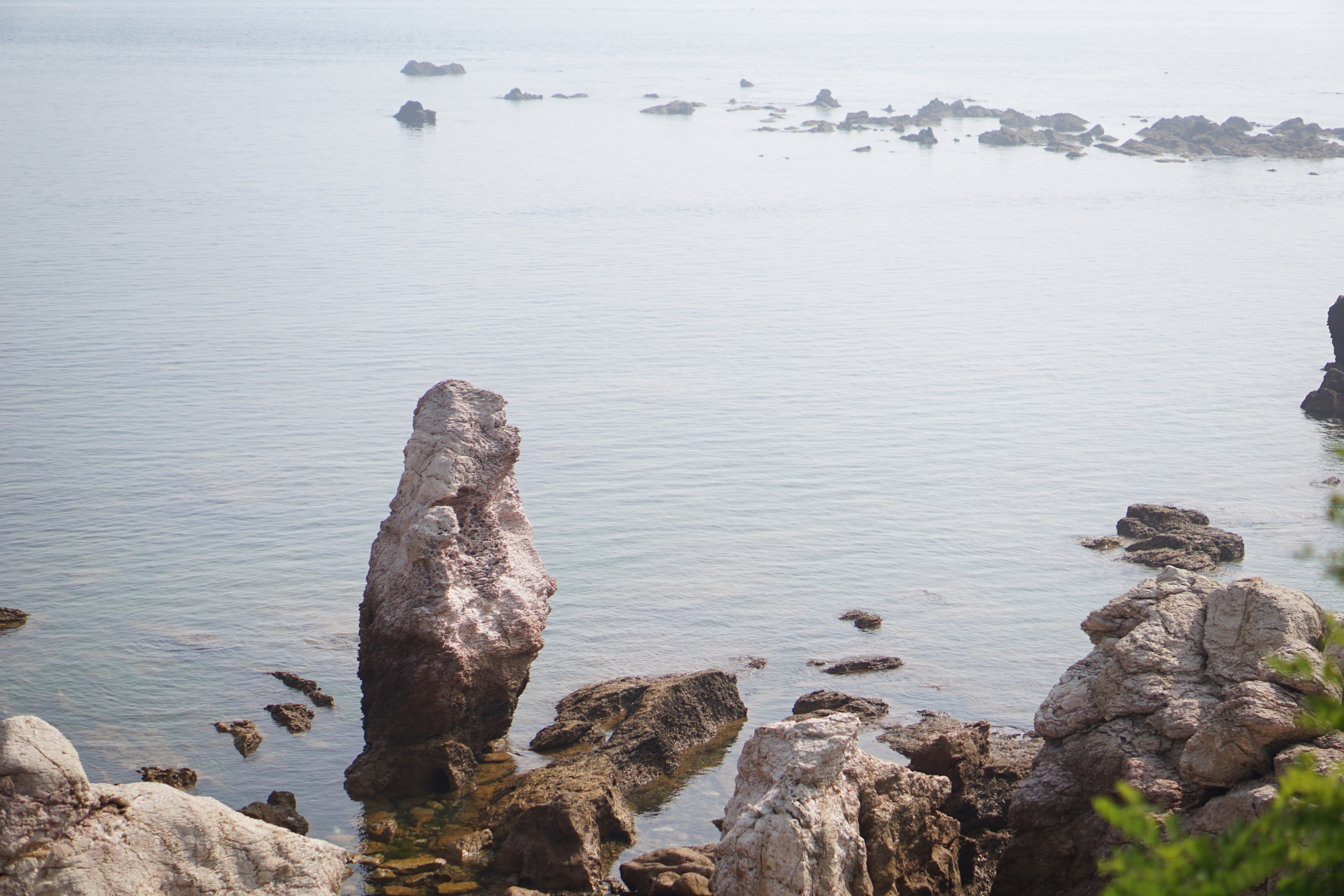
Monkey-shaped sea stack off the coast at Dalian Coastal National Geopark

The Discoveryland Theme Park (发现王国, also translated as "the Discovery Kingdom") was built in 2006 and covers an area of 1,217,294 km^{2} (470,000 sq mi). It was designed by Romero Petrilli VanRell Associates who participated in the design of the Disney theme park.

=== Lüshunkou District (in the southwestern suburbs) ===
- Lüshun Museum
- Lüshun Railway Station
- East Jiguan Mountain (东鸡冠山), Hill 203 and Shuishiying Meeting Place

The fiercest battle site and the signing site of the ceasefire treaty, of the Battle of Lüshun during the Russo-Japanese War (1904–05).

- Japanese and Russian Prison Site Museum in Lüshun

The prison was built by Russians in 1902 and later expanded by the Japanese. During World War II, the prison was used to detain people of various nationalities who were against the Japanese invasion. An Jung-geun, the Korean independence activist who assassinated Itō Hirobumi, was imprisoned and killed there.

- Lüshun Snake Museum, and Lüshun Bird Port and Snake Island Reservation
- Hengshan Temple and Longwangtang Cherry Blossom Park

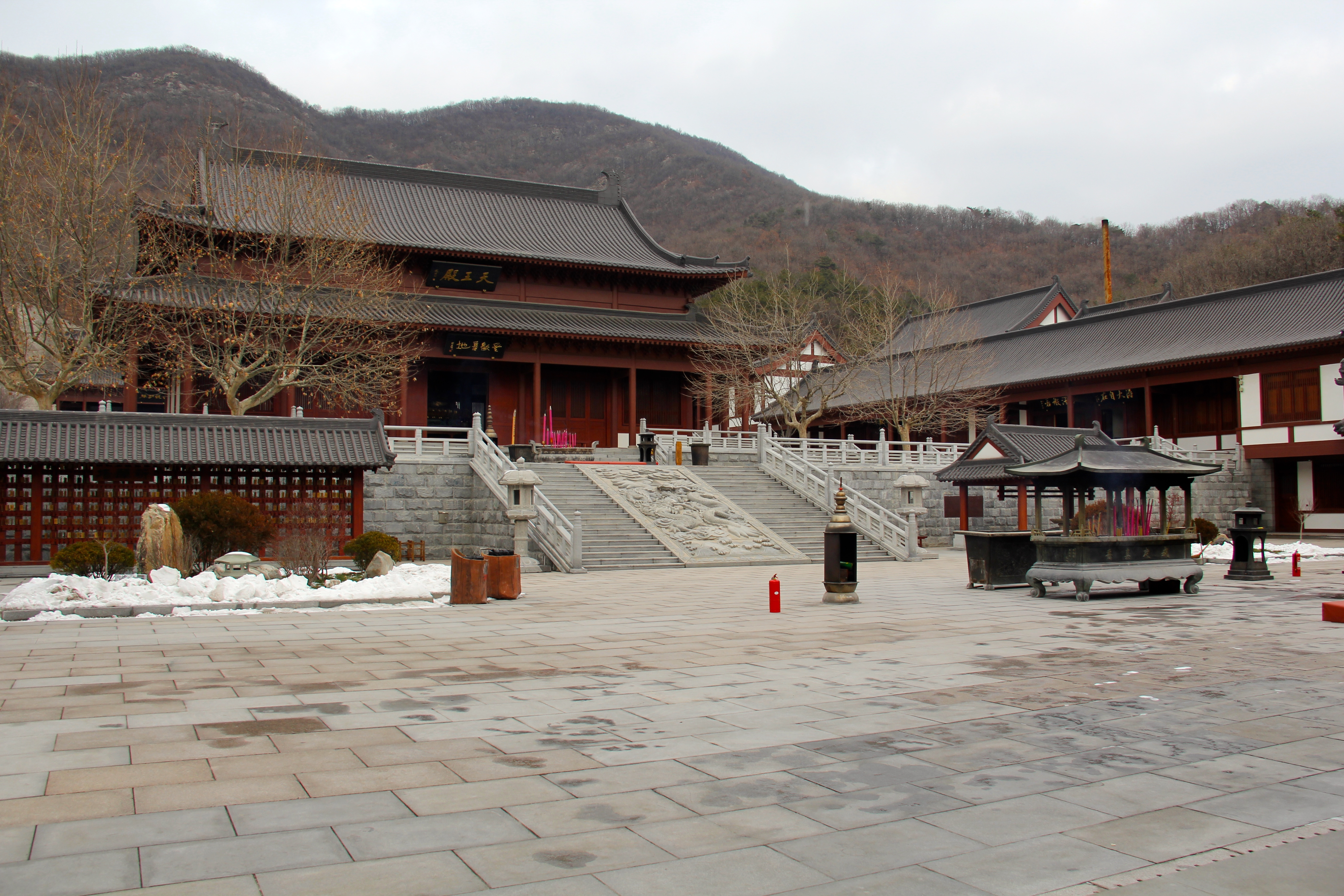
Hengshan Temple in Lüshunkou District

Hengshan Temple (横山寺) is near Longwangtang Reservoir (龙王塘水库). The temple dates back to the Han dynasty, and was rebuilt in 2003.

=== Pulandian District ===
- Anbo Hotspring and Ski Course (安波温泉滑雪场), in Pulandian District

=== Wafandian ===
- Changxing Island International Golf Course, in Wafangdian

=== Zhuanghe ===
- Bingyu Valley Scenic Area and Buyun Mountain Hot Spring (步云山温泉), in Zhuanghe

=== Changhai County ===
- Islands of Changhai County

=== Hot spring and ski resorts ===
There are various hot spring hotels in Dalian. Notable ones include Laotieshan Hot Spring Hotel in Lüshunkou District, Tang Dynasty Hot Spring Resort in Jinshitan, Minghu Hot Spring Hotel in Wafangdian, Chengyuan Hot Spring Villa in Ganjingzi District, and Tianmu Hot Spring Hotel in Lüshunkou District.

Skiing has become increasingly popular in Dalian. Famous ski resorts are Linhai Ski Resort in Ganjingzi District, Anbo Ski Resort in Pulandian District, Minghu Ski Resort & Minghu International Skiing Holiday Village in Wafangdian, and Dalian Happy Snow World in Ganjingzi District near the airport.

== Environment ==
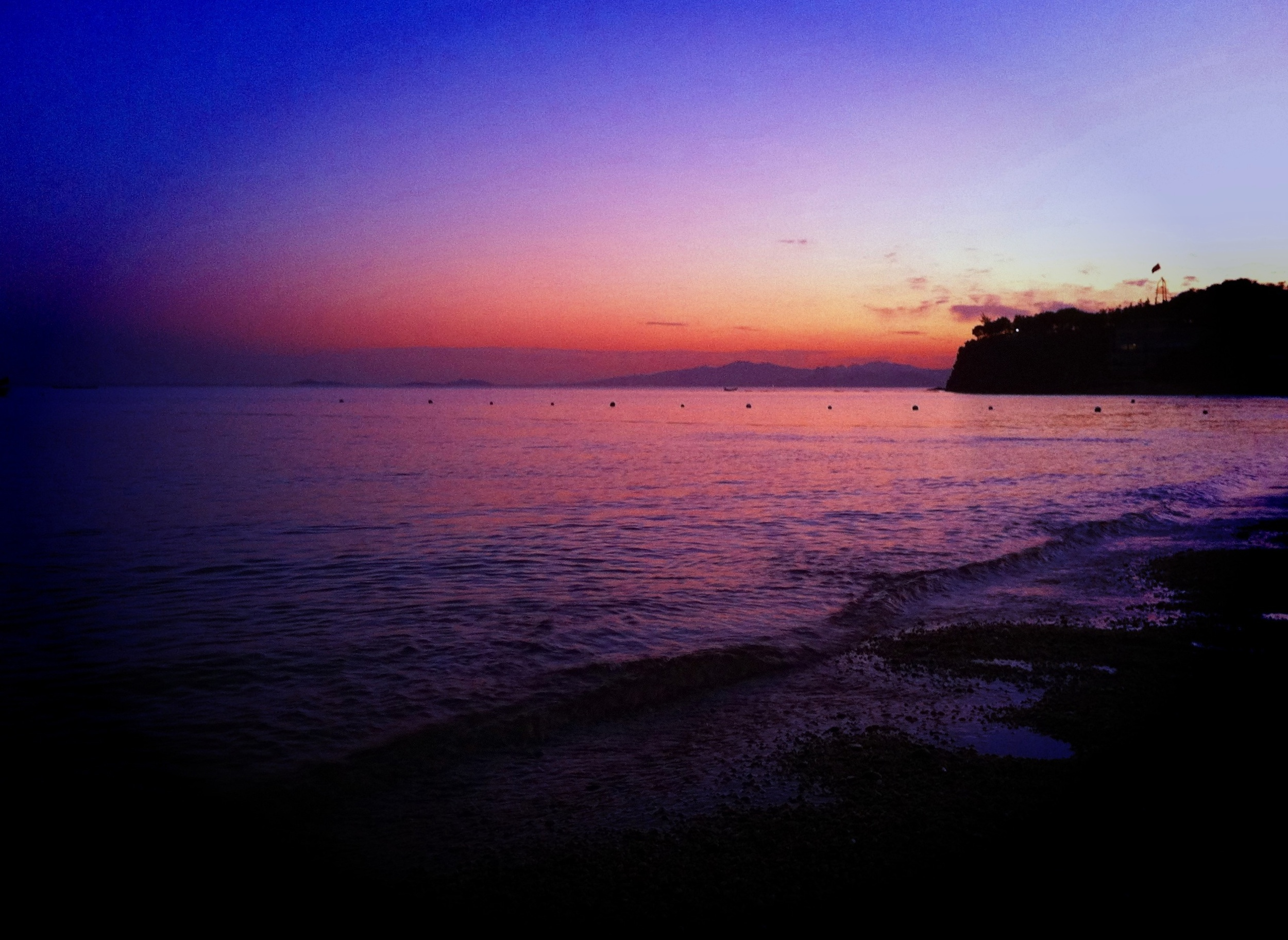
Beach side sunset

=== Ecological conservation ===
Despite being in a period of economic and industrial growth, Dalian has placed an emphasis on environmental protection. Dalian's ecological restoration and protection efforts are ongoing and expanding. In 2021, Dalian set a five-year-plan for the marine environment that included targets for conserving populations of the endangered black-faced spoonbill. In 2019, 49 nests were built for the black-faced spoonbill on nearby uninhabited islands. There has also been conservation and rescue efforts targeting spotted seal populations. Dalian also maintains the National Spotted Seal Nature Reserve within Lioadong Bay. This reserve is home to a spotted seal population and is a breeding ground for multiple marine species.

=== Environmental issues ===
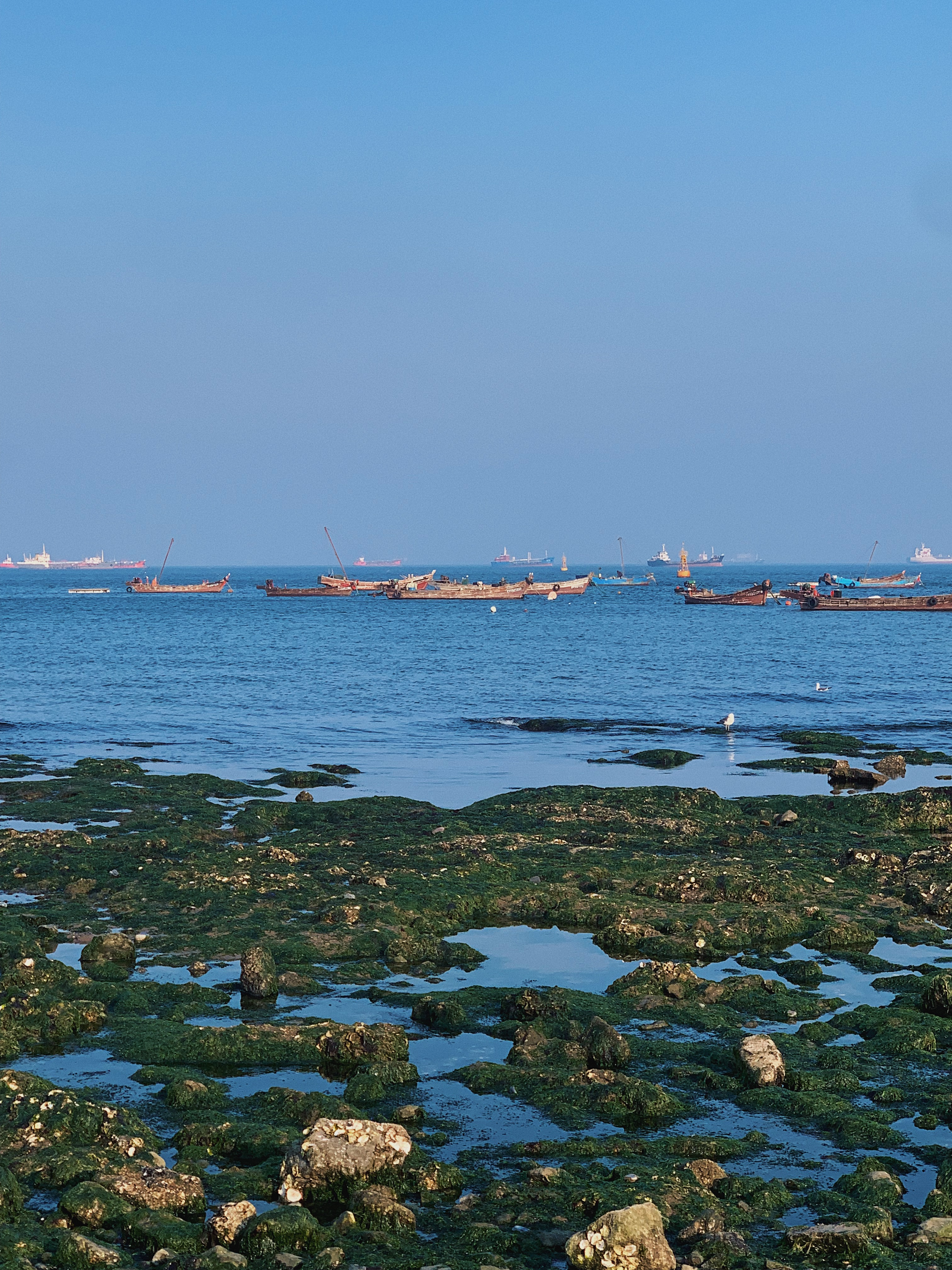
Seaside at Xieziwan (蟹子湾) Park

In 2001, the United Nations Environment Programme awarded the Dalian Municipal Government for its outstanding contribution to the protection of the environment.

The average content of the four pollutants in the air reached Class II of National Ambient Air Quality Standards and there were 353 days with Air Pollution Index (API) over Class II (Good), including 108 excellent days with Class I (Superior). Dalian frequently ranks Grade 2 for air pollution according to State Environmental Protection Administration. However, the environmental effects of economic growth are of concern, according to Dalian Environmental Protection Agency, during the first half of 2011, respirable particles in the air increased significantly, with an average 40% higher than 2010.

The water quality of offshore marine space remained stable overall. The annual average content of monitoring indicators for water quality met Class-II of the National Seawater Quality Standard, with the exception of Inorganic Nitrogen in Dalian Bay and the city's southern coast. The water quality of drinking water sources is considered good and complies with Class-III of Environmental Quality Standards for Surface Water.

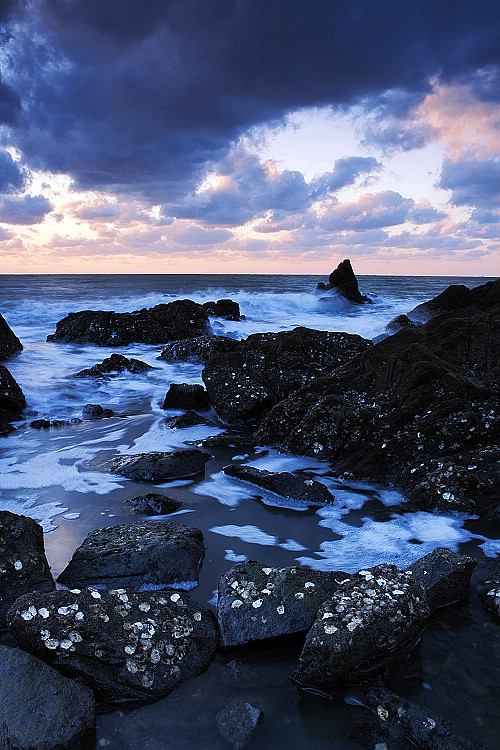
Seascape at Heishijiao (黑石礁) Geological Park

Recent events have had a major environmental impact on the city. In July 2010, the explosion of two petroleum pipelines released 11,000 barrels of oil into the Yellow Sea, according to official statements. Rick Steiner, an American marine conservationist working with Greenpeace, says that the figure could be upwards of 400,000. It was reported as the largest oil spill to occur in China, and involved 2,000 firefighters. The oil spill stretched for at least 50 square kilometers (19 sq mi). 800 fishing boats were mobilized for the cleanup. The incident caused President Hu Jintao and Premier Wen Jiabao to intervene, and Vice Premier Zhang Dejiang moved in to help direct the rescue work. A researcher with the China Environmental Science Research Institute, said that "the impact on marine life and on humans – as the pollution enters the food chain – could last 10 years." This has compounded aquatic pollution, affecting the city's fishing industry.

In August 2011, a dike protecting the petrochemical Fujia Factory in Jinzhou District was breached due to a typhoon. Authorities have ordered the plant to be shut down. Around 12,000 residents protested as the factory, which originally was intended to be based in Xiamen, did not receive official approval to operate in Dalian. Municipal authorities ruled that the facility must move, leaving taxpayers to pay the expensive cost of relocation.

Concerns have been raised over mounting traffic due to "bad urban design" and that the growing rate of car ownership is affecting air quality. The United States National Academy of Engineering have raised concern about rising traffic in Dalian stating that "rapid growth of traffic in Dalian and in similar Chinese cities will repeat the air quality and energy consumption mistakes of Los Angeles and other U.S. cities, if not better managed."

== Transportation ==
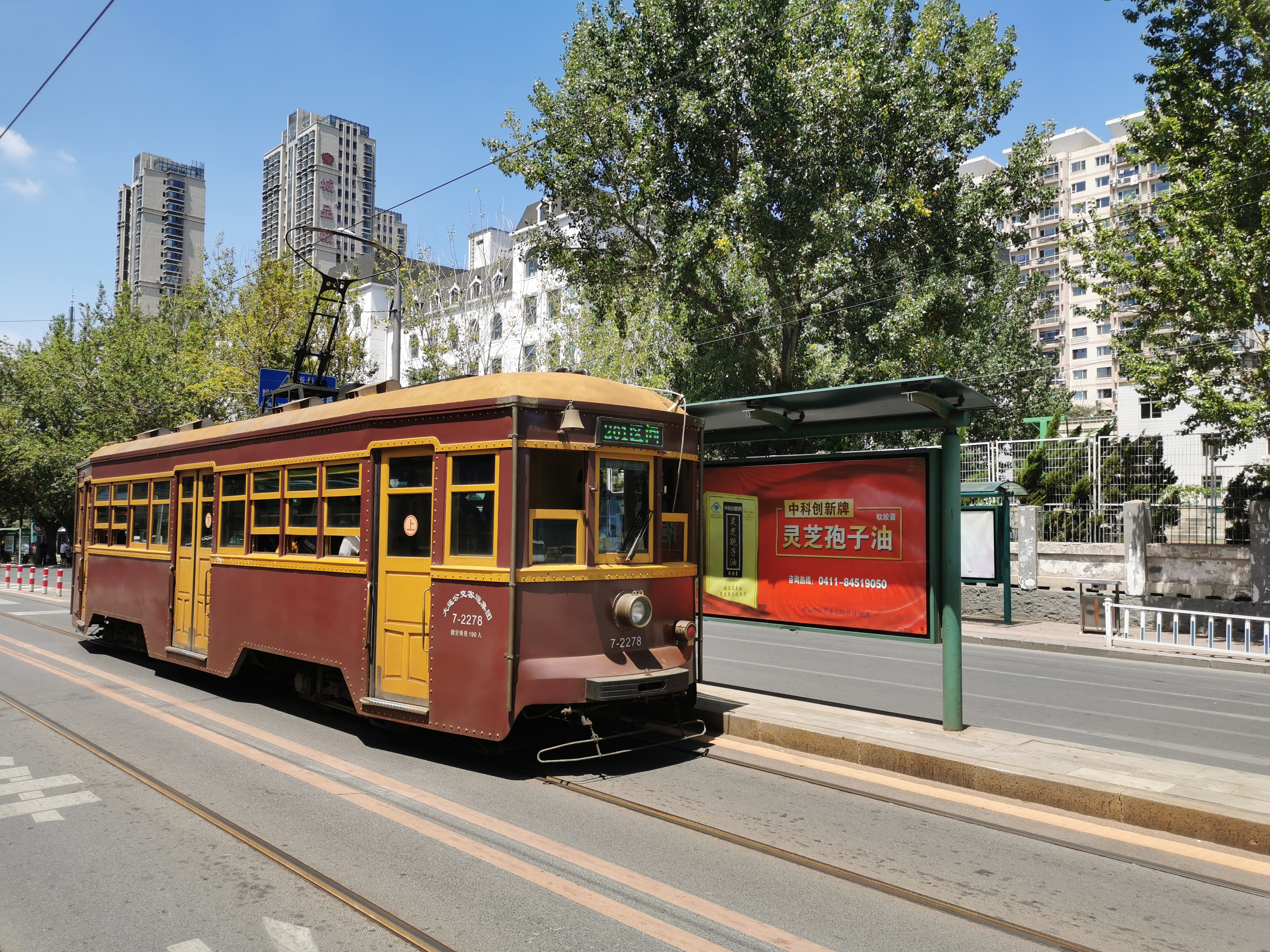
Dalian historical tramway, still used in a limited area of the city.

=== Local transportation ===
Cycling is not as popular in Dalian as in other Chinese cities because of the hilly roads. Dalian is also one of the many cities in China where there are few motorcycles in the downtown core, where motorcycle riding is prohibited by the local law.

The city has a comprehensive bus system and an efficient metro system. As of March 2023, the Dalian Metro consists of the underground Line 1, Line 2, Line 5 and the overground Line 3, Line 12 and Line 13. New lines and expansion of the metro system are under way including Line 4 and Line 7. The new rail traffic system is designed to connect the entire city in the coming future. The Dalian Tram system is the second oldest in China. Most of the public transportation in the city can be accessed using the Mingzhu IC Card (明珠卡).

=== Domestic and international ===
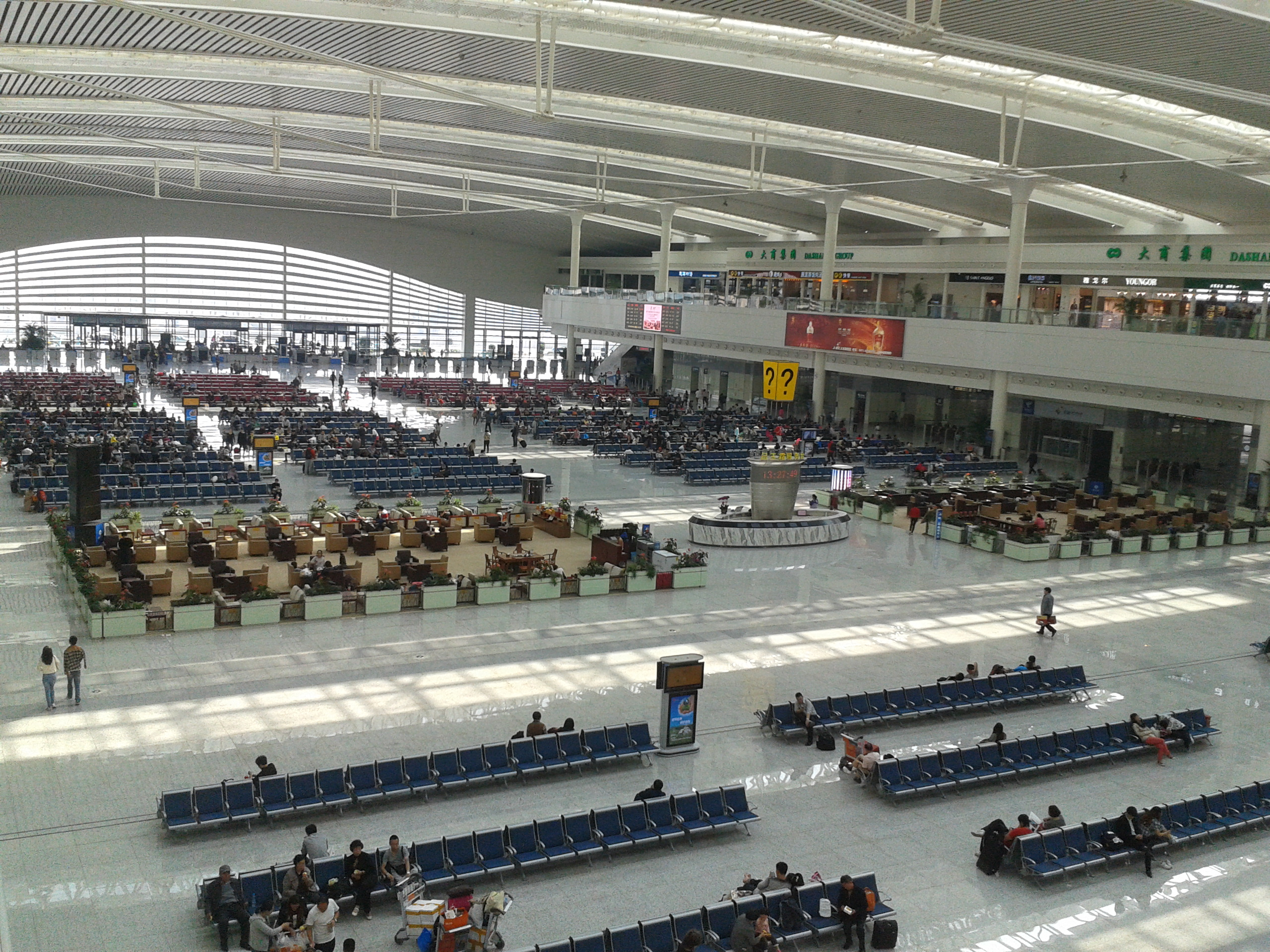
Internal view of Dalian North railway station

In 2005, Dalian expanded the international airport, Dalian Zhoushuizi International Airport, with direct flights to the most major cities in China, and to cities in South Korea and Japan as well as countries in Southeast Asia. In 2014, the airport was the 20th busiest airport in China with 13,551,223 passengers. The airport is the hub of Dalian Airlines.

The new airport Dalian Jinzhouwan International Airport (IATA: DLC, ICAO: ZYTL) is also under way. Once open, it will replace the existing city's main airport. It is being built on 21 square kilometres (8.1 sq mi) of reclaimed land off the coast of Dalian. Expected to open in 2026, it is set to become the world's largest offshore airport.

The city's location means that train trips to most Chinese cities outside China's northeastern region require changing trains in Beijing or Shanghai. With the high-speed rail system, trips from Dalian to Shenyang can be completed in 1.5 hours, to Changchun 2.5 hours and to Harbin 3.5 hours. The city has two major railway stations, namely Dalian railway station and Dalian North railway station, the latter being part of the Harbin–Dalian high-speed railway.

In addition to local and express bus services to Beijing and other areas in the northeast, Dalian is connected by passenger ship service to neighboring coastal cities, including Tianjin, Yantai, Weihai, Penglai and Dongying, as well as Incheon, South Korea.

== Culture ==
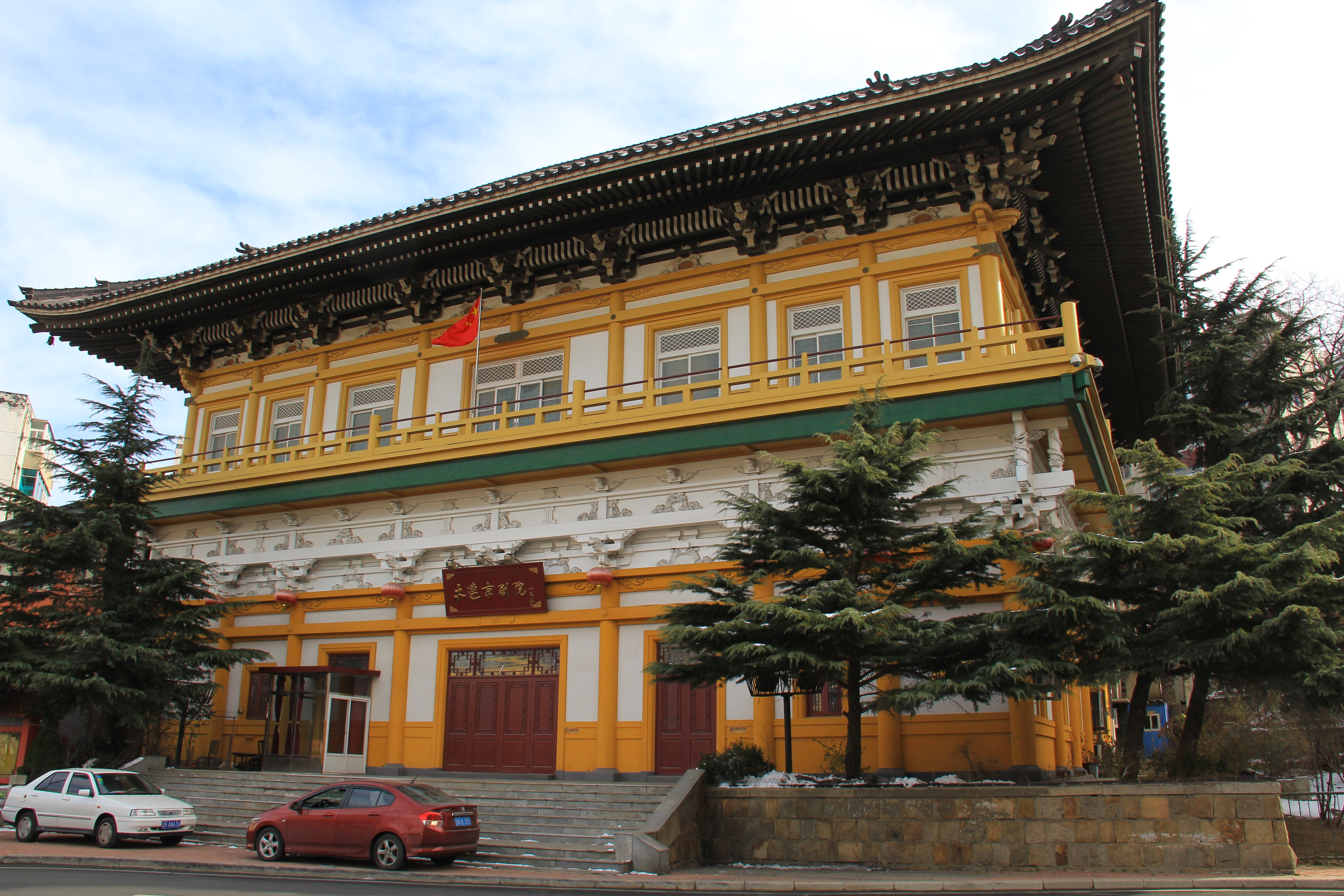
Dalian Peking Opera House

In 2006, Dalian was selected as the most liveable city in China according to China Daily.

=== Dalian dialect ===
Dalian dialect belongs to the Jiaoliao Mandarin subgroup spoken in parts of Shandong and Liaoning provinces, which is a separate branch from Northeastern Mandarin. Most of the residents of Dalian were farmers and fishermen who had come from Shandong Province in a large population move, the Chuang Guandong, during which era Dalian was occupied by the Japanese as the Kwantung Leased Territory. Dalian dialect incorporates a few loanwords from Japanese and Russian (very rare in Chinese), reflecting the history of foreign occupation. Dalian dialect is mostly distinguishable from Standard Mandarin based on a low-falling Yinping 阴平 (31) and rich tone sandhi, and it is often referred to as being "oyster flavored" (海蛎子味) by the locals.

=== Cuisine ===
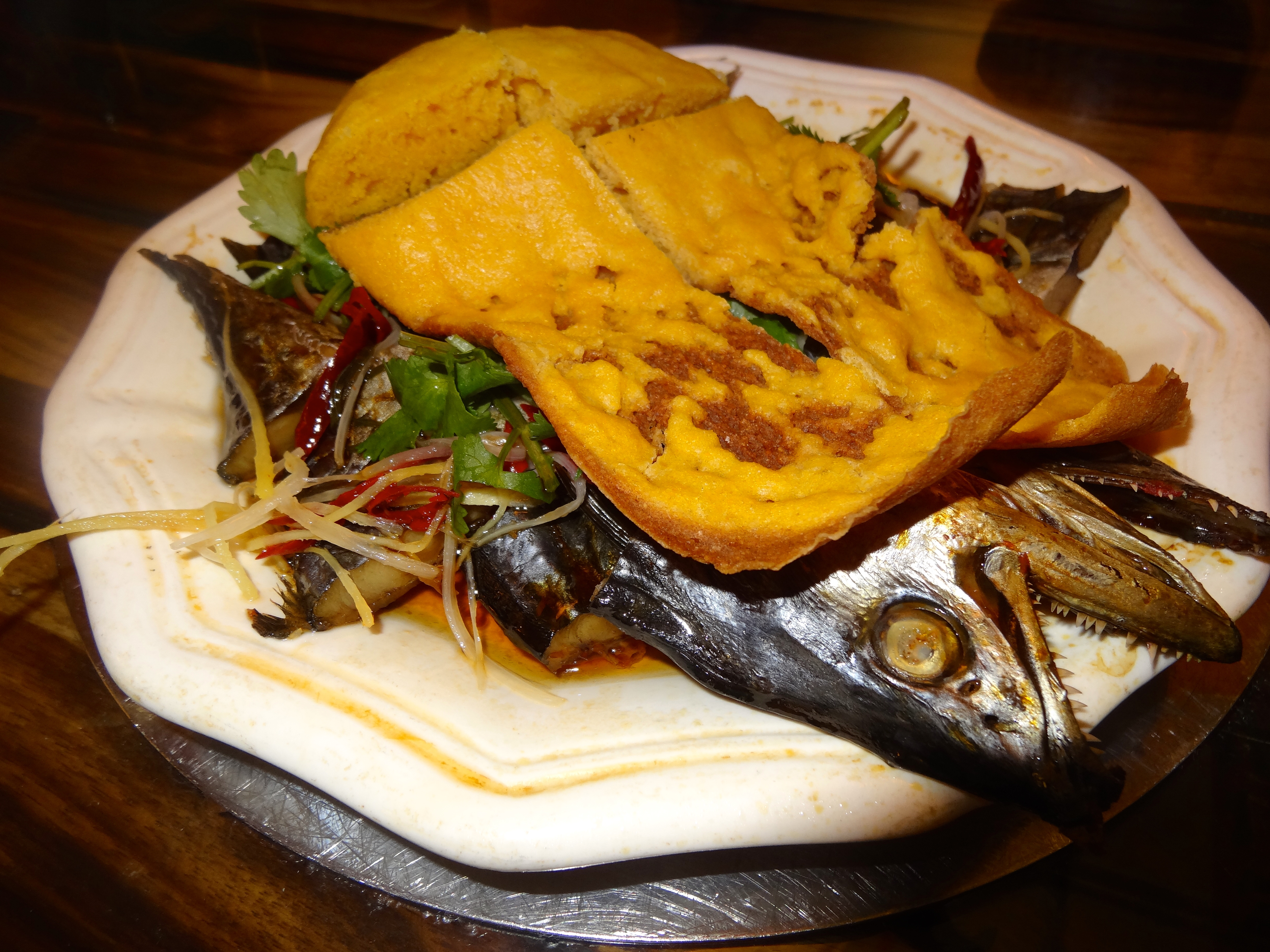
Salted Fish with Corn Cake

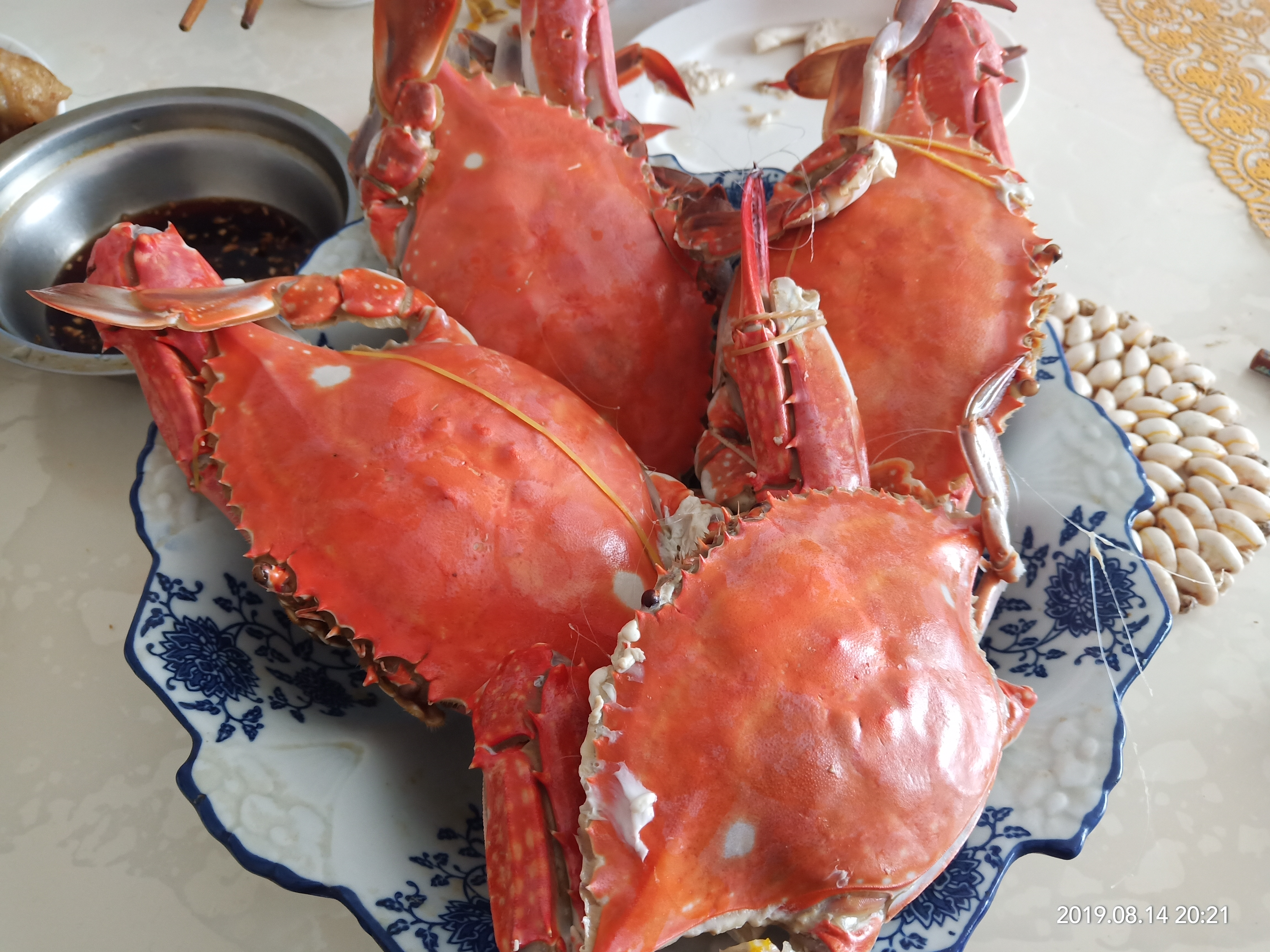
Boiled crabs in Dalian

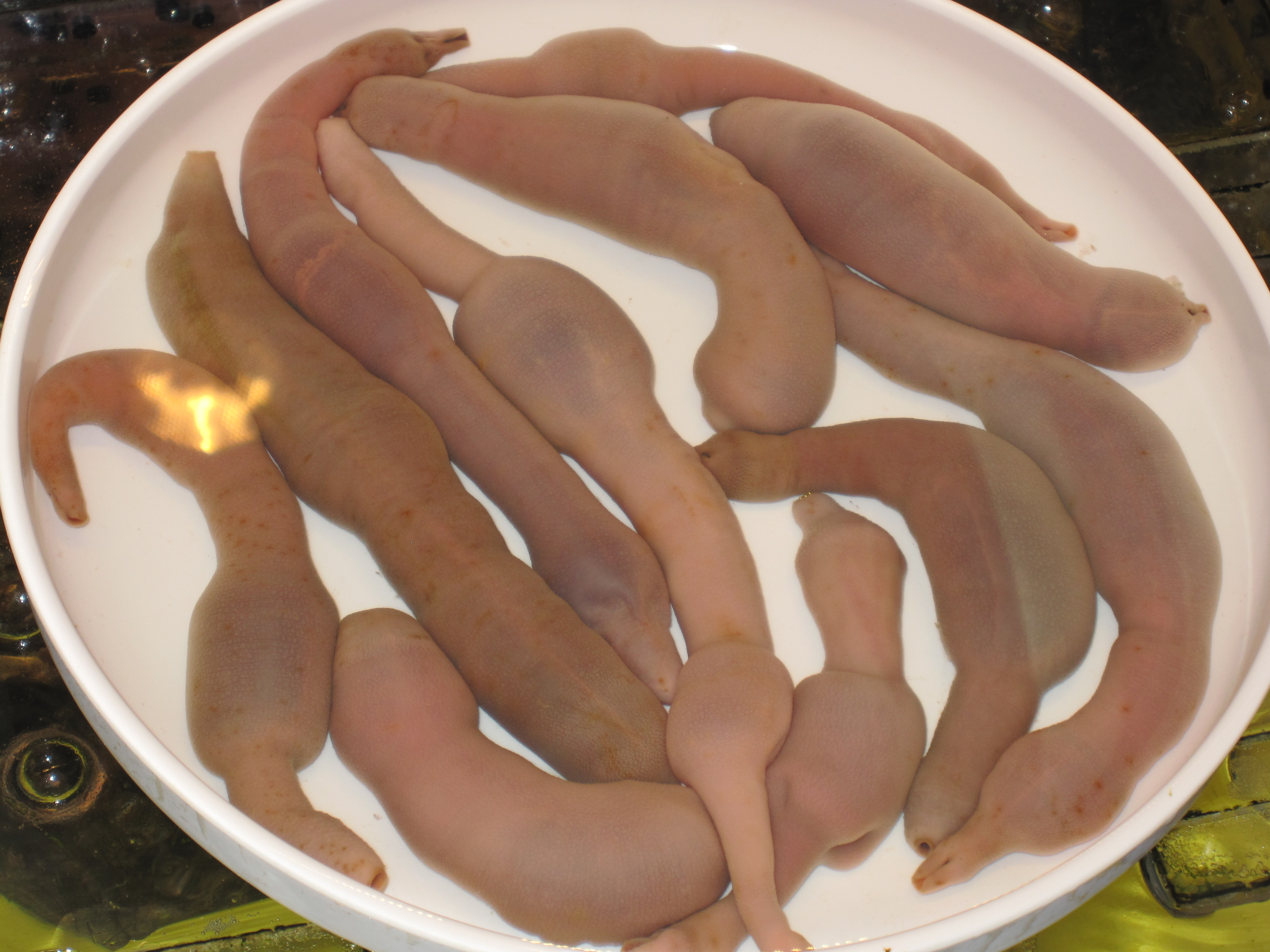
Urechis unicinctus

Dalian cuisine is a branch of Shandong cuisine, with influence from Northeastern Chinese cuisine, and is widely known for its unique style of seafood dishes. The variety of seafood in Dalian includes fish, prawns, clams, crabs, scallops, sea urchins, oysters, sea cucumbers, mussels, lobsters, conches, abalone, algae, razor clams, urechis unicinctus, mantis shrimps, jellyfish and so on. During the winter, many seafoods such as clams, mussels and abalone gain the most fat.

Colorful Snowflake Scallops (五彩雪花扇贝) is a local seafood dish, where egg white is made into snowflake-shape to embrace the scallops, with seasonal greens, carrot and hot pepper cut into small pieces as decorations on top.

Another popular local dish is Salted Fish with Corn Cake (咸鱼饼子), where steamed or fried corn cake is served with fried salted fish. Legend goes that, in the old days fishermen going out fishing in the morning couldn't return home to have lunch, so they baked fresh fish to eat with corn cakes, and the habit passed down from generation to generation and eventually became a famous food among local people.

Dalian-style Grilled Squid (大连铁板鱿鱼) is also a local delicacy. It originated in Dalian, where the squid is produced. It is made by frying the squid on an iron plate, then cutting the squid into sections with a spatula, and sprinkling it with special sauce.

Menzi (焖子) is a traditional local snack. A protein-rich starch paste coagulated from an extract of potatoes is cut into pieces and fried on a pan to create a crisp cover. A mixed seasoning of smashed garlic, sesame, and sauces is added on eating.

Other popular local specialties include seafood noodles, roast full prawns, salt baked conches, lantern-shaped steamed abalone, and so on.

=== Theaters ===
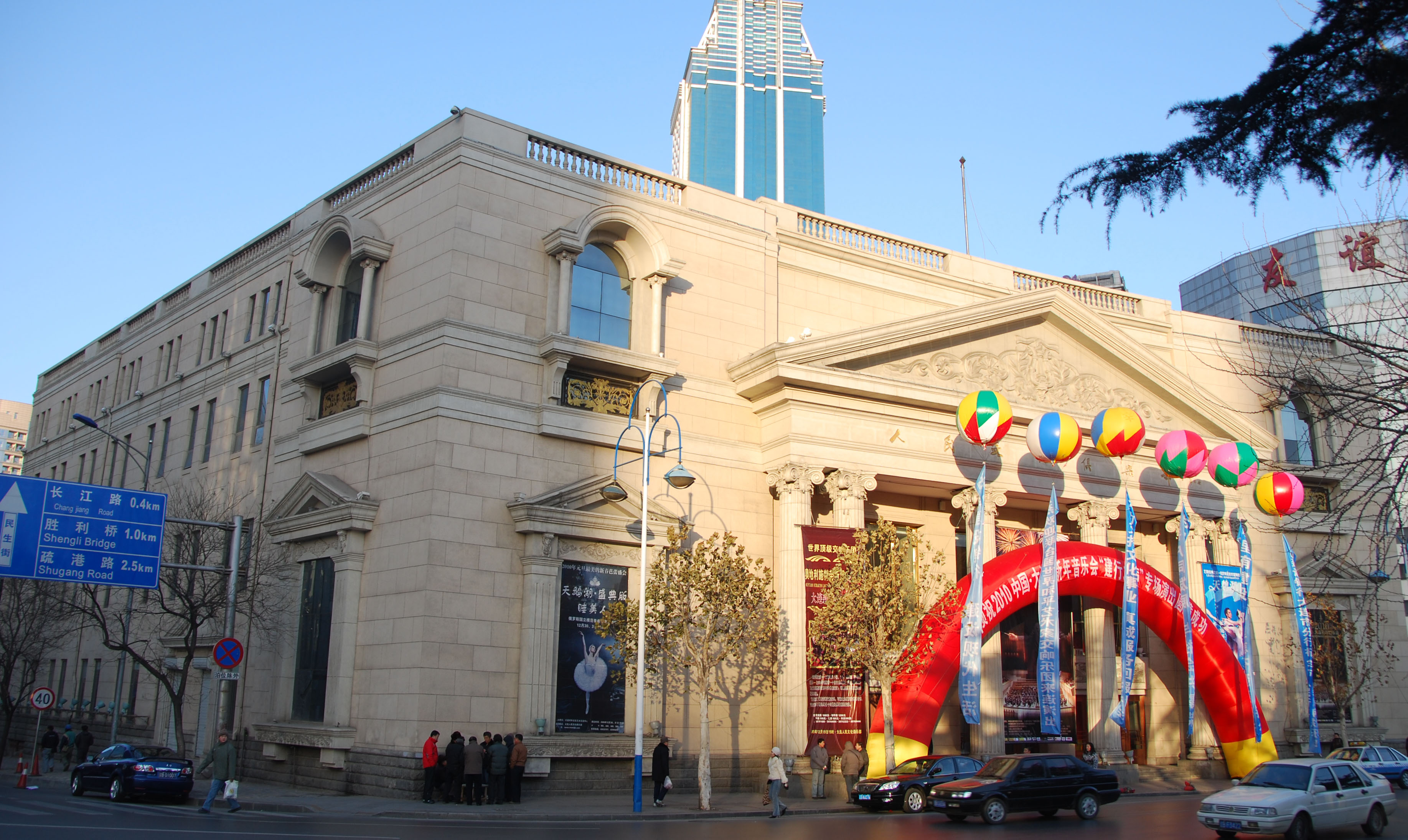
Dalian People's Culture Club in December, which is the busiest month.

Well-known theaters in Dalian are: Dalian People's Culture Club (mainly for music), Hongji Grand Stage (for Beijing Opera), Working People's Theater-Doudou Grand Stage (工人剧院/豆豆大舞台, mainly for Errenzhuan) and Development Area Grand Theater (开发区大剧院).

=== Sports ===
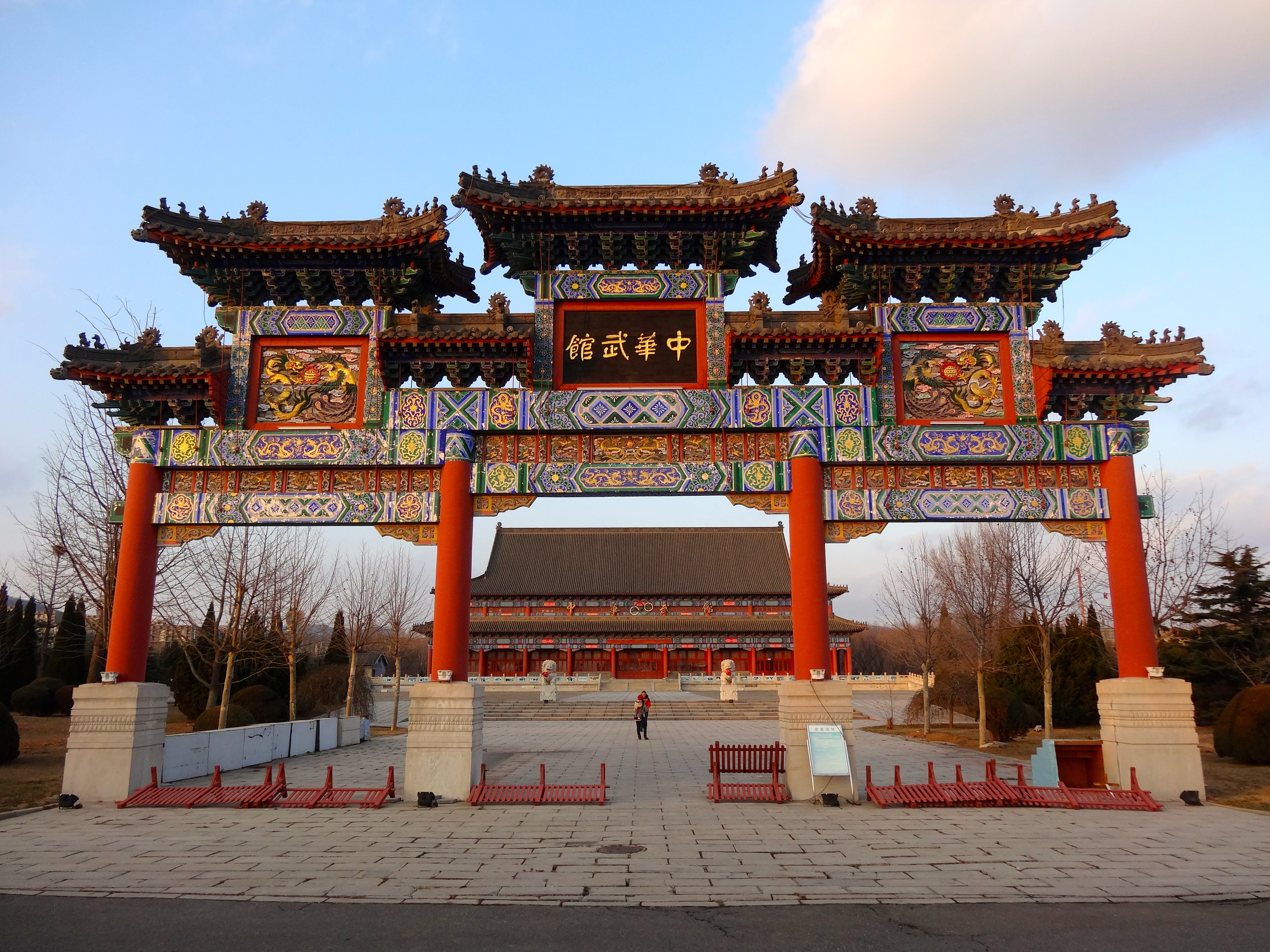
China Martial Arts Hall, at Jinshitan National Holiday Resort

Sports play a big role in the local culture. Dalian's former football club, Dalian Shide (formerly known as Dalian Wanda as the club was originally sponsored by the Dalian Wanda Group), achieved a total of eight titles from China's top-tier football league, the Chinese Jia-A League and the later rebranded Chinese Super League, and was widely considered one of the most successful clubs in Chinese football history. In the Asian Football Confederation, the club reached the 1997–98 Asian Club Championship and 2000–01 Asian Cup Winners' Cup finals. Several of China's greatest players, including Sun Jihai, Hao Haidong and Li Ming, made their names with Dalian Shide. Dalian also produced many top Chinese football players thanks to its youth training system and grassroots football culture. As of the 2014 season of the Chinese Super League, out of the 448 registered Chinese players, a total of 71 players are from Dalian. Therefore, Dalian earned its nickname of China's "Football City" (足球城), and a giant football statue was placed in the Labor Park near downtown Dalian in its honor. Current football clubs in the city are Dalian Yingbo playing in the Chinese Super League and Dalian Pro W.F.C. playing in the Chinese Women's Football League. Both of their home stadiums are the Dalian Suoyuwan Football Stadium.

The 63,677-capacity Dalian Suoyuwan Football Stadium, 60,663-capacity Dalian Sports Centre Stadium, the 30,777-capacity Jinzhou Stadium, the 30,000-capacity Puwan Stadium and the 8,000-capacity Dalian Medical University Stadium are notable stadiums in Dalian.

Other popular sports enjoyed by the local Dalianese include swimming, skiing, golf, cycling, bowling and billiards. The government organizes various events every year in Dalian, like marathon, tennis and so on.

As part of the 2013 National Games of China in Liaoning in 2013, Dalian was a host city for 12 events, including synchronized swimming, field hockey, gymnastics, sailing and canoeing.

In February 2018, Dalian Wanda Group decided to take over Dalian Pro (then Dalian Yifang), after a lapse of 20 years before Wanda Group decided to reinvest in a Dalianese football club. Wanda Group announced a long-term investment plan to help Dalian build more advanced football infrastructure, improve on youth training, and revitalize local football culture and Chinese football culture as a whole.

=== City-wide festivals and events ===
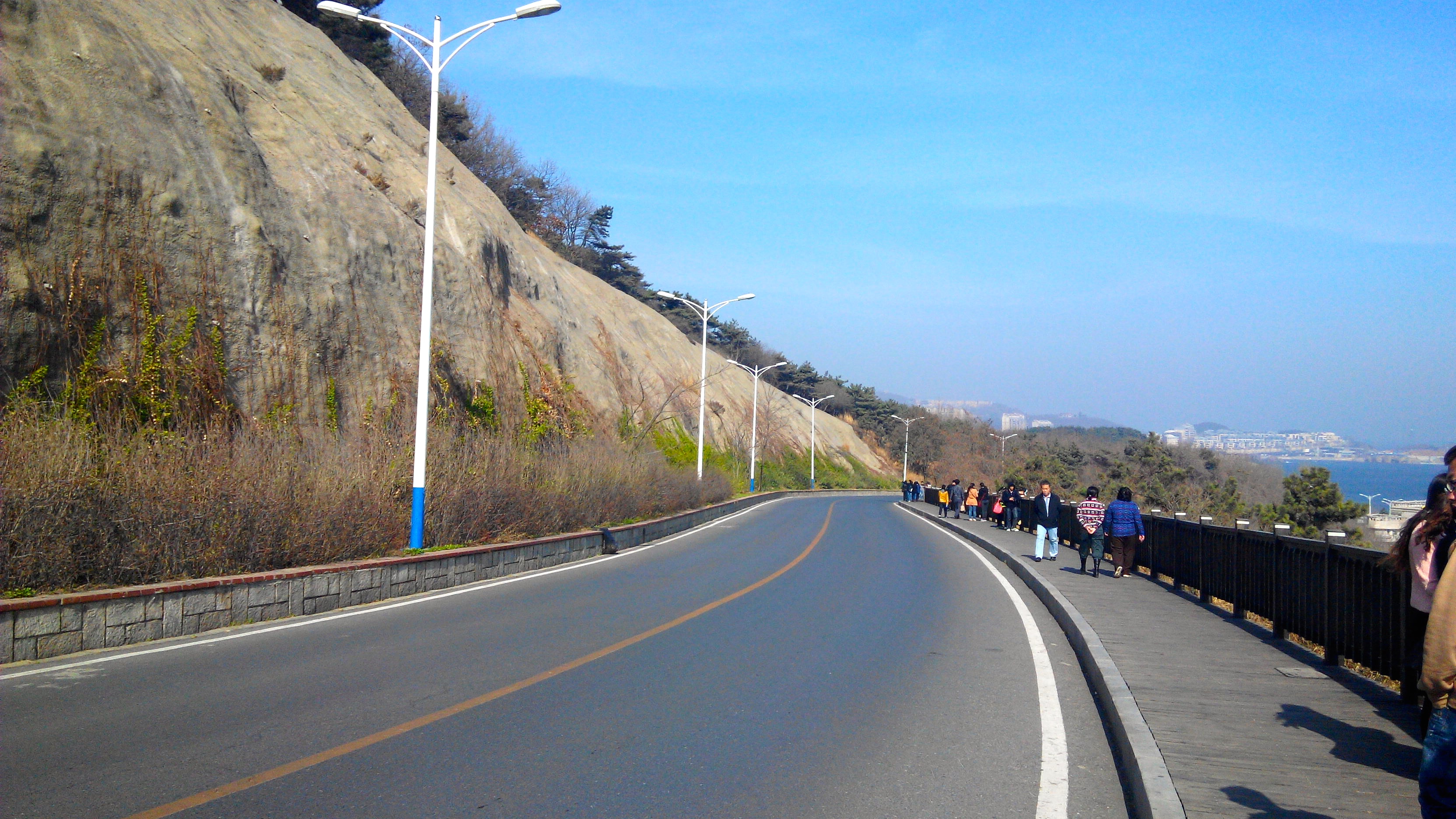
Binhai Road is the main route for Dalian International Walking Festival. View of mountain on one side and sea on the other makes it a popular exercise destination for local people.

Xinghai Square, Dalian Xinghai Convention & Exhibitions Center, the Dalian World Expo Center and the hotels on Renmin Road are the main places where Dalian's major annual events are held.

Every year from January to February, the Bingyugou Ice Lantern Festival is held in Bingyugou Scenic Area in Zhuanghe City. The event features a large number of ice sculptures, snow sculptures and colorful ice lanterns. Visitors can also participate in a series of ice-sports including ice-skating, ice hockey and iceboating.

From late April to May, the Lüshun International Cherry Blossom Festival is held. The main site is 203 Hill, and the other site is Longwangtang Cherry Blossom Park. It is said that the first cherry trees were planted by Japanese soldiers stationed in Lüshun during World War II, in order to ease their homesickness. Today, the 203 Hill site has more than 3000 cherry trees, and boasts to be the largest cherry blossom park in China with the most varieties.

Each May, the Dalian International Walking Festival takes place. The purpose of the festival is to foster health and peace for the whole community. It is widely popular among citizens and attracts many foreign participants. Dalian is the only city in China recognized by the IML Walking Association. Four different routes of 30 km (19 mi), 20 km (12 mi), 10 km (6 mi), and 5 km (3 mi) are provided for participants, with the longest route going from Xinghai Square along Binhai Road to Laohutan Ocean Park, Bangchuidao Scenic Area and finally reaching Dalian International Conference Center. Starting from 2012, Jinshitan National Holiday Resort also serves as a venue for the festival.

Every May, the Dalian International Marathon is held. With the first marathon held in 1987, it is one of the four oldest marathon races in China. The main venue is the Jinshitan National Holiday Resort.

Every June, the China International Software & Information Service Fair is held in Dalian World Expo Center. Officials from overseas government departments, CEOs of World Top 500, well-known consulting firms and overseas IT associations attend the fair each year.

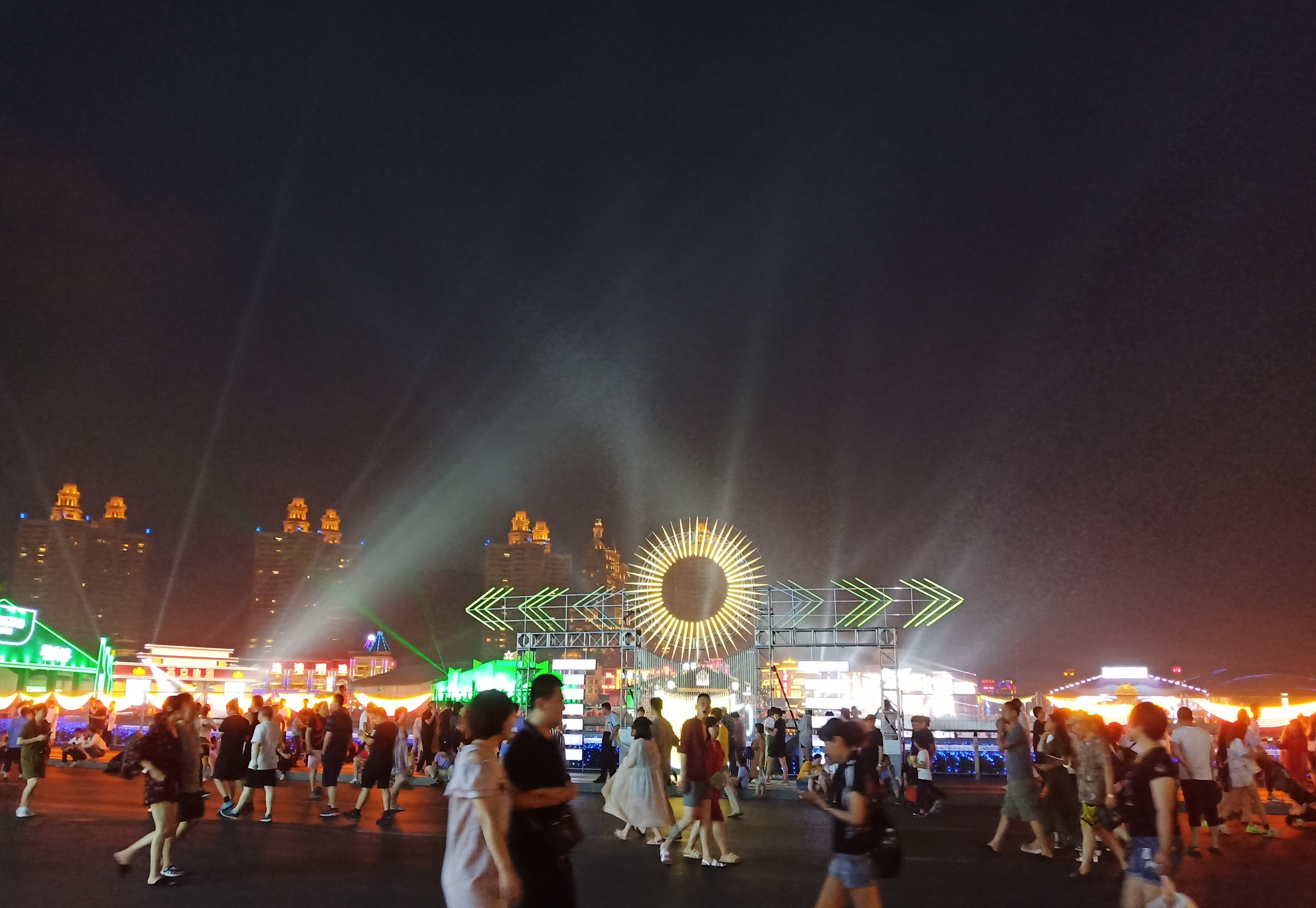
Dalian International Beer Festival in 2019

Dalian International Beer Festival takes place in Xinghai Square every year from July to August. It is similar to Oktoberfest in Munich and is a widely popular event in the city. Activities of the Beer Festival include exhibitions by beer manufacturers, a beer disco plaza, a beer culture exhibition, a beer drinking contest, a photography contest, the Beer Industry Summit, and a beer quiz.

Dalian International Automotive Exhibition is held in August in Dalian Xinghai Convention & Exhibitions Center and Dalian World Expo Center.

The annual Dalian International Fashion Festival is held in September in Dalian Xinghai Convention & Exhibitions Center and Dalian World Expo Center. For the past decade, the festival has been attracting the world's top fashion designers, businessmen and models to Dalian. Arrangement for the show includes various theme activities including the Garment Export Fair, fashion exhibitions, fashion competitions and a model contest.

=== Inter-governmental ===
Japan maintains a branch office for its Consulate General of Japan at Shenyang and a JETRO office in Dalian, reflecting a relatively large Japanese population.

Japan Chamber of Commerce & Industry has about 700 corporate members. Those Japanese who had lived in Dalian before the War have organized the Dalian Society.

=== Religion ===
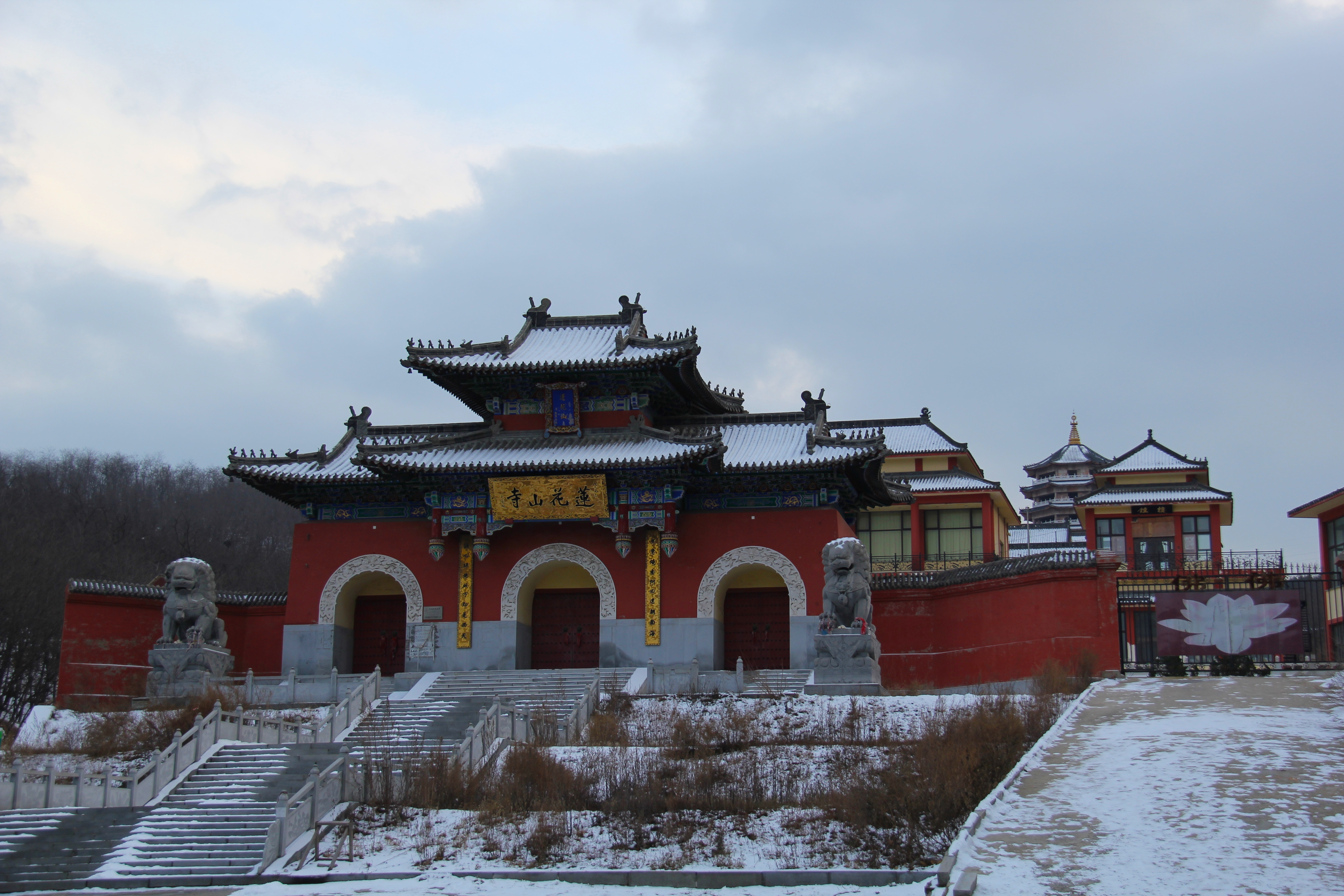
Lianhuashan (lit. "lotus flower mountain") Temple, Dalian

As of 2005, Dalian had 29 Christian churches (27 of them Protestant, 2 of them Catholic), 10 mosques, 34 Buddhist temples, and 7 Taoist temples, according to the statistics of the city government.

Taoist temples can be found in various districts including downtown Dalian (Hua Temple in Zhongshan Park), in Lüshunkou District (Longwang Temple), and in Jinzhou District (Jinlong Temple in Daweijia, Xiangshui Temple at the foot of Dahei Mountain, and Zhenwu Temple in Liangjiadian).

Buddhist temples are in downtown Dalian (Songshan Temple on Tangshan Street and Lianhuashan Temple on Yingchun Road), on the northern side of Anzi Mountain (Anshan Temple), at Daheishi (Thousand-Hand Buddha & 500 Luohan Statues), in Lüshunkou District (Hengshan Temple at Longwangtang), and in Jinzhou District (Guanyinge-Shengshui Temple on Dahei Mountain).

Dalian Catholic Church (built in 1926) is in downtown Dalian, west of Dalian Railway Station. Protestant churches are near Zhongshan Square (Yuguang Street Church, the former Dalian Anglican Church, built in 1928 in the British Consulate General's premises by the Church of England and Anglican Church of Japan jointly), on Changjiang Road (Beijing Street Church, now called Cheng-en Church, originally built in 1914 by the Danish Lutheran Church), on Xi'an Road (Christian Church for Korean Chinese and South Koreans), east of the airport (the newly built Harvest Church, which can seat 4000 people), in Jinzhou (the newly built Jinzhou Church) and in Lüshunkou District (Lüshun Church, a former Danish Lutheran church). Dalian Mosque is on Beijing Street.

== Notable people ==
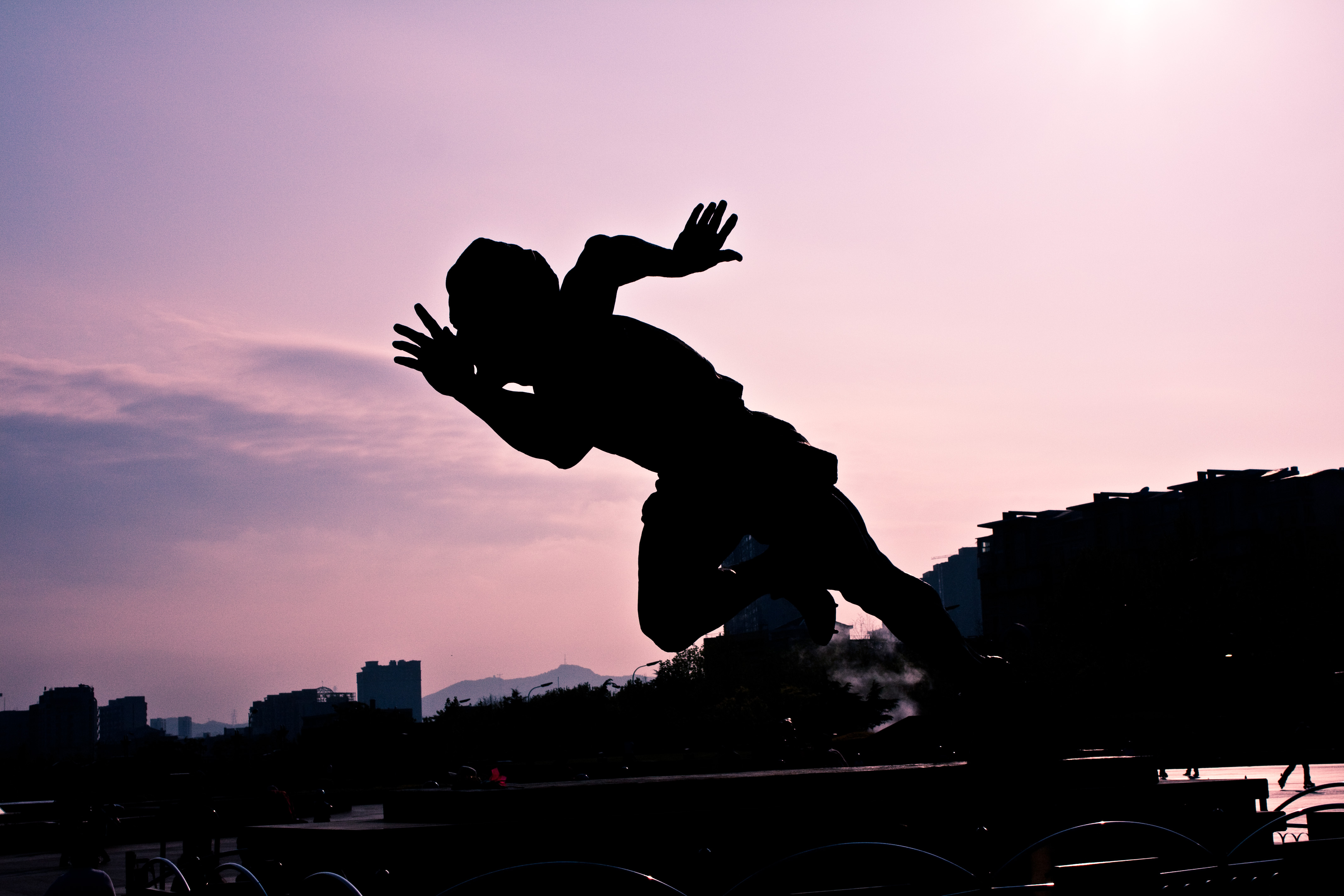
Liu Changchun statue at Olympic Square, Dalian

- Xia Deren (夏德仁), former mayor from October 2006 to May 2009.
- Li Changchun (李长春), politician, former member of the Politburo Standing Committee of the Chinese Communist Party.
- Bo Xilai (薄熙来), former mayor (February 1993–August 2000), removed from Politburo under corruption charges.
- Lai Yawen (赖亚文), retired middle blocker, former captain and current team manager of the China women's national volleyball team.
- Sun Jiadong (孙家栋), aerospace engineer and recipient of the "Two Bombs, One Satellite" Meritorious Award.
- Qi Faren (戚发轫), aerospace engineer and chief designer of the Chinese spacecraft Shenzhou.
- Zhao Xiaozhe (赵晓哲), vice admiral of the PLA
- Liu Yanan (刘亚男), retired middle blocker of the China women's national volleyball team.
- Yang Hao (杨昊), retired outside spiker of the China women's national volleyball team.
- Hui Ruoqi (惠若琪), retired outside spiker and former captain of the China women's national volleyball team.
- Li Yongbo (李永波), retired badminton player and former head coach of the China National Badminton Team.
- Liu Changchun (刘长春), sprinter, first athlete to represent China in competition at the Olympic Games.
- Qu Yunxia (曲云霞), middle-distance athlete.
- Zhang Wenxiu (张文秀), hammer thrower.
- Zhang Enhua (张恩华), footballer.
- Sun Jihai (孙继海), footballer.
- Bi Fujian (毕福剑), director, host and professor.
- Wang Lei (王雷), actor.
- Yu Nan (余男), actress.
- Lou Yixiao (娄艺潇), actress.
- Dong Jie (董洁), actress.
- Lin Peng (林鹏), actress.
- Yang Hongji (杨洪基), baritone singer and professor.
- Sun Nan (孙楠), singer.
- Kelly Yu (于文文), singer.
- Xue Jiye (薛继业), painter and sculptor.
- Toshiko Fujita (藤田 淑子), Japanese voice actress.
- Song Weilong (宋威龙), actor and model.
- Yang Zhuo (杨茁), professional Wushu fighter and kickboxer.
- Yu Xiaonan (于晓楠), Chinese Canadian ballet dancer.
- Sun Yu (孙瑜), badminton player.
- Keiichi Inamine (稲嶺 惠一), Japanese politician
- Harry Triguboff, Jewish Australian businessman
- Feng Enhe (冯恩鹤), actor
- Min Chen, plant physiologist

== Education ==
There are 23 general institutions of higher education (and another 7 privately run colleges), 108 secondary vocational schools, 80 ordinary middle high schools, 1,049 schools for nine-year compulsory education and 1,432 kindergartens in Dalian. The students on campus of all levels (including kindergartens) totaled 1108 thousand.

Dalian is one of the top 40 science cities in the world by scientific research as tracked by the Nature Index, ranking 37th globally in 2023. There are the following schools of higher education and research centers:

=== Colleges and universities ===
- Dalian University of Technology (Project 985, Project 211, founded in 1949)
- Dalian Maritime University (Project 211, founded in 1909)
- Dongbei University of Finance and Economics (Founded in 1952)
- Liaoning Normal University (Founded in 1951)
- Dalian University (Founded in 1987)
- Dalian Jiaotong University (Founded in 1956)
- Dalian Medical University (Founded in 1947)
- Dalian Minzu University (Founded in 1997)
- Dalian Ocean University (Founded in 1952)
- Dalian Polytechnic University (Founded in 1958)
- Dalian University of Foreign Languages (Founded in 1964)
- Dalian Naval Academy of the PLA Navy (Founded in 1949)
- Liaoning Police College (Founded in 1960)
- Dalian Neusoft University of Information (Founded in 2000)

=== Research centers ===
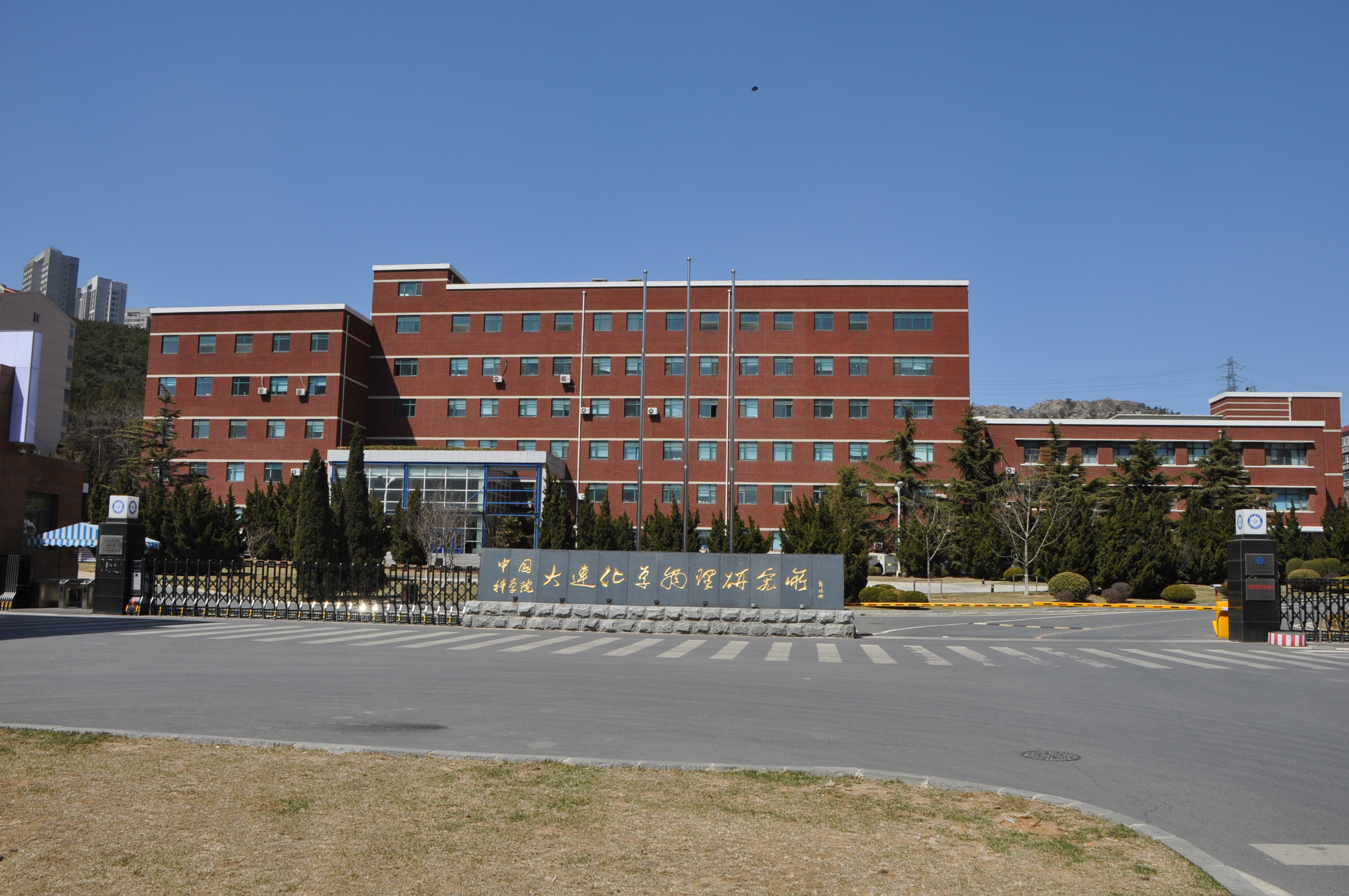
Dalian Institute of Chemical Physics, of the Chinese Academy of Sciences

- Dalian Institute of Chemical Physics of the Chinese Academy of Sciences

=== High schools ===
Notable high schools include:

- Dalian No. 1 High School (大连市第一中学)
- Dalian No. 8 High School (大连市第八中学)
- Dalian No. 11 High School (大连市第十一中学)
- Dalian No. 12 High School (大连市第十二中学)
- Dalian No. 20 High School (大连市第二十中学)
- Dalian No. 23 High School (大连市第二十三中学)
- Dalian No. 24 High School (大连市第二十四中学)
- Dalian Yuming Senior High School (大连育明高级中学)
- The High School Affiliated to Liaoning Normal University(辽宁师范大学附属中学)
- Dalian Lüshun Senior High School (大连市旅顺中学)
- Dalian Jinzhou Senior High School (大连市金州高级中学)
- Dalian Haiwan Senior High School (大连海湾高级中学)
- Wafangdian Senior High School (瓦房店市高级中学)
- Zhuanghe Senior High School (庄河市高级中学)
- Changhai County Senior High School (长海县高级中学)

=== International schools ===
- Japanese School of Dalian
- Dalian Korean International School
- Dalian American International School
- Dalian Maple Leaf International School

== International relations ==
Dalian is twinned with:

- Adelaide, South Australia
- Adjara, Georgia
- Akita, Japan
- Austin, Texas, United States
- Bahía Blanca, Argentina
- Bangkok, Thailand
- Bergen, Norway
- Bremen, Germany
- Cape Breton Island, Nova Scotia, Canada
- Chuncheon, South Korea
- Cienfuegos, Cuba
- Dallas, Texas, United States
- Derry and Strabane, Northern Ireland, UK
- Ehime, Japan
- Enschede, Netherlands
- Fortaleza, Brazil
- Genoa, Italy
- Glasgow, Scotland, UK
- Gwangju, South Korea
- Gwangyang, South Korea
- Houston, Texas, United States
- Imari, Saga, Japan
- Incheon, South Korea
- Jeju Province, South Korea
- Kanazawa, Ishikawa, Japan
- Kitakyushu, Fukuoka, Japan
- La Paz, Bolivia
- Le Havre, Seine-Maritime, France
- Los Angeles County, California, United States
- Maizuru, Kyoto, Japan
- Milan, Italy
- Northampton, England, UK
- Oakland, California, United States
- Ohrid, North Macedonia
- Ōta, Tokyo, Japan
- Pohang, South Korea
- Pointe-Noire, Republic of the Congo
- Pyeongtaek, South Korea
- Rijeka, Primorje-Gorski Kotar, Croatia
- Rostock, Mecklenburg-Vorpommern, Germany
- Sarajevo Canton, Bosnia and Herzegovina
- Surin Province, Thailand
- Tomsk, Tomsk Oblast, Russia
- Vladivostok, Primorsky Krai, Russia
- Wolfsburg, Lower Saxony, Germany

== See also ==
- Chinese ship Dalian

== Bibliography ==
- Kuramoto, Kazuko. Manchurian Legacy: Memoirs of a Japanese Colonist, 1st edition. Michigan State University Press. 1 October 1999. ISBN 0-87013-510-4, ISBN 978-0-87013-510-1, ISBN 0-87013-725-5, ISBN 978-0-87013-725-9.
