= Dalian Hi-tech Zone =

Industrial district in Dalian, China

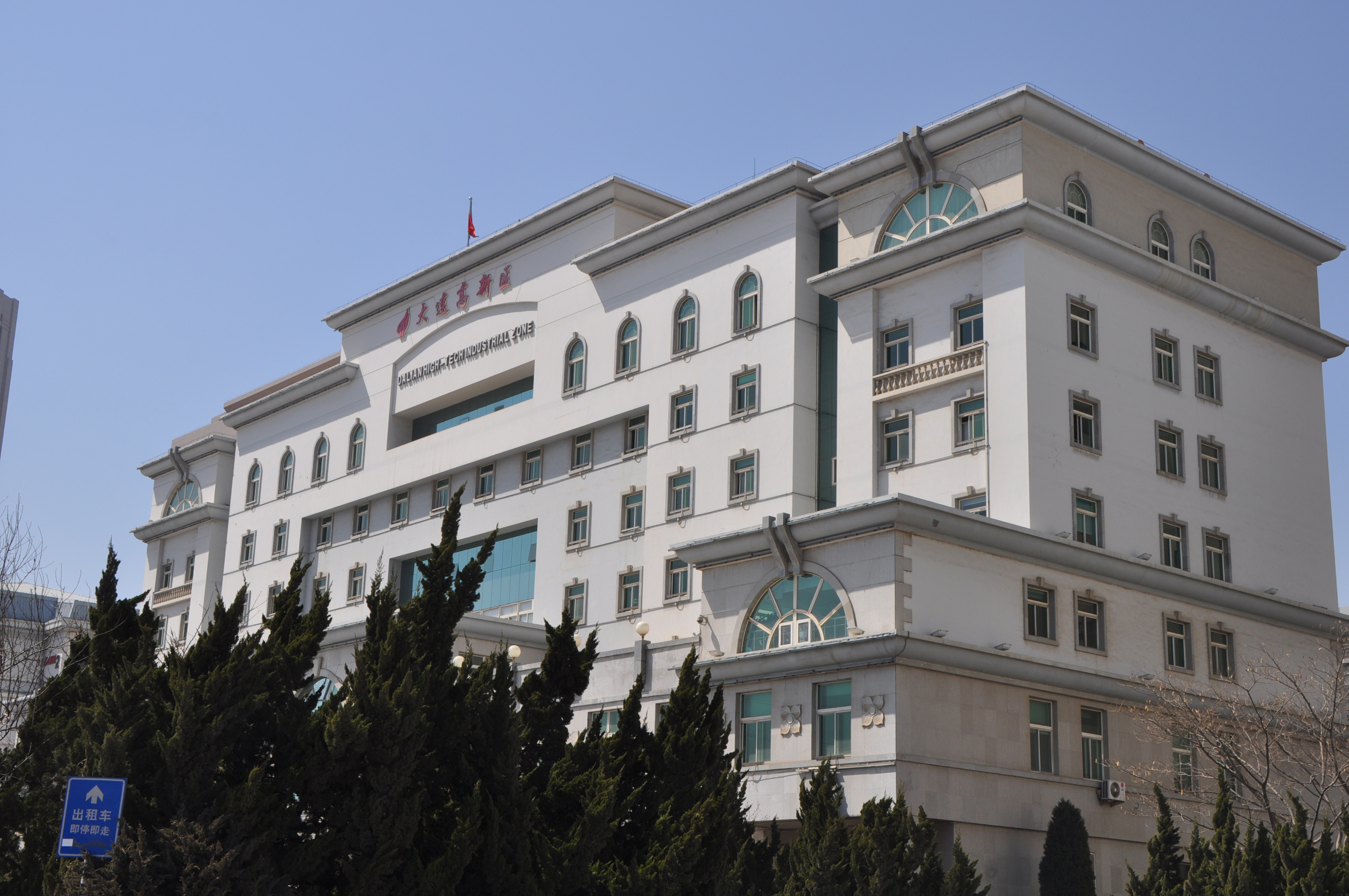
Dalian Hi-tech Zone Administration Bldg.

Dalian Hi-tech Zone (Chinese: 大连高新技术产业园区 or 大连高新区) or DHZ (variant officially used spellings include Dalian High-tech Zone) is an industrial district in the western suburbs of Dalian, Liaoning, China. It extends about 30 kilometres along Lüshun South Road and Guoshui Highway in Shahekou District and Lüshunkou District, where many of the world's multinational technology companies have operations.

== History ==
The construction of DHZ started in 1991. Dalian Software Park was added in 1998. The second phase of Dalian Software Park kicked off in 2003 at the site of Dalian Ascendas IT Park, which officially opened in 2007. DHZ is often called "Lushun South Road Software Industry Belt".

== IT parks in Dalian Hi-tech Zone ==
The whole area of Dalian Hi-tech Zone is under the oversight of the Dalian Hi-tech Industrial Zone Administrative Committee, but all parks therein are managed by private enterprises, except Dalian Hi-tech Zone and Animation Industry Base. From east to west, they are:

Shahekou District

Along Lushun South Road:

=== Dalian Software Park ===
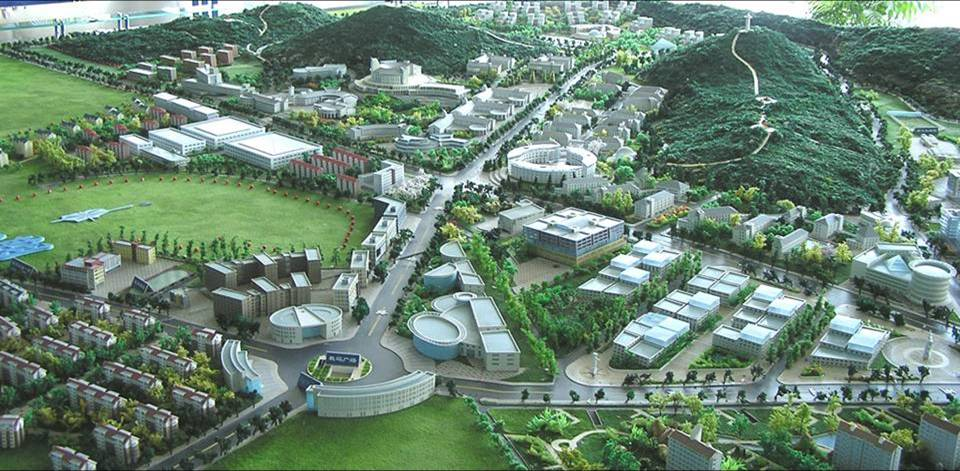
Dalian Software Park - A 2007 Model

- Name: Dalian Software Park (大连软件园)
- Established: 1998
- Managed by Dalian Software Park Co., Ltd., a subsidiary of Yida Group

Address: 1 Digital Square, Dalian, Liaoning, China (大连市数码广场1号)

- Area: 3 km^{2}
- 500 companies, including: Accenture, Genpact, HP, IBM (moving to Dalian Tiandi Software Park), Sony, Panasonic, NEC, Softbank, NEC.
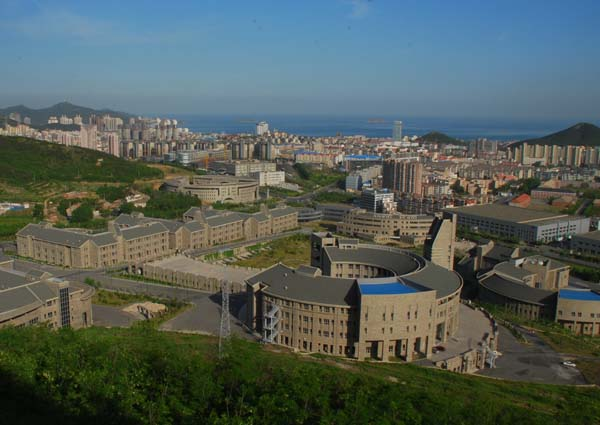
Dalian Software Park

=== Lingshui Bay General Headquarters ===
Now being reclaimed from the Yellow Sea

=== Qixianling Modern Service Industry Area ===
- Name: Qixianling Modern Service Industry Nucleus Function Area (七贤岭现代服务业核心功能区)

This area is often called "Dalian Hi-tech Zone" in its narrow sense.

- Established: 1991
- Managed by: Dalian Hi-tech Industrial Zone Administrative Committee

Address: 1 Gaoxin Street, Qixianling Industrial Base, Dalian, Liaoning, China (大连市高新技术产业园七贤岭产业化基地高新街1号)

- Area: 2 km^{2}
- 800 companies, including Dalian Hi-Think Computer, Citibank, Dell, HiSoft Technology International, NHN Corporation.
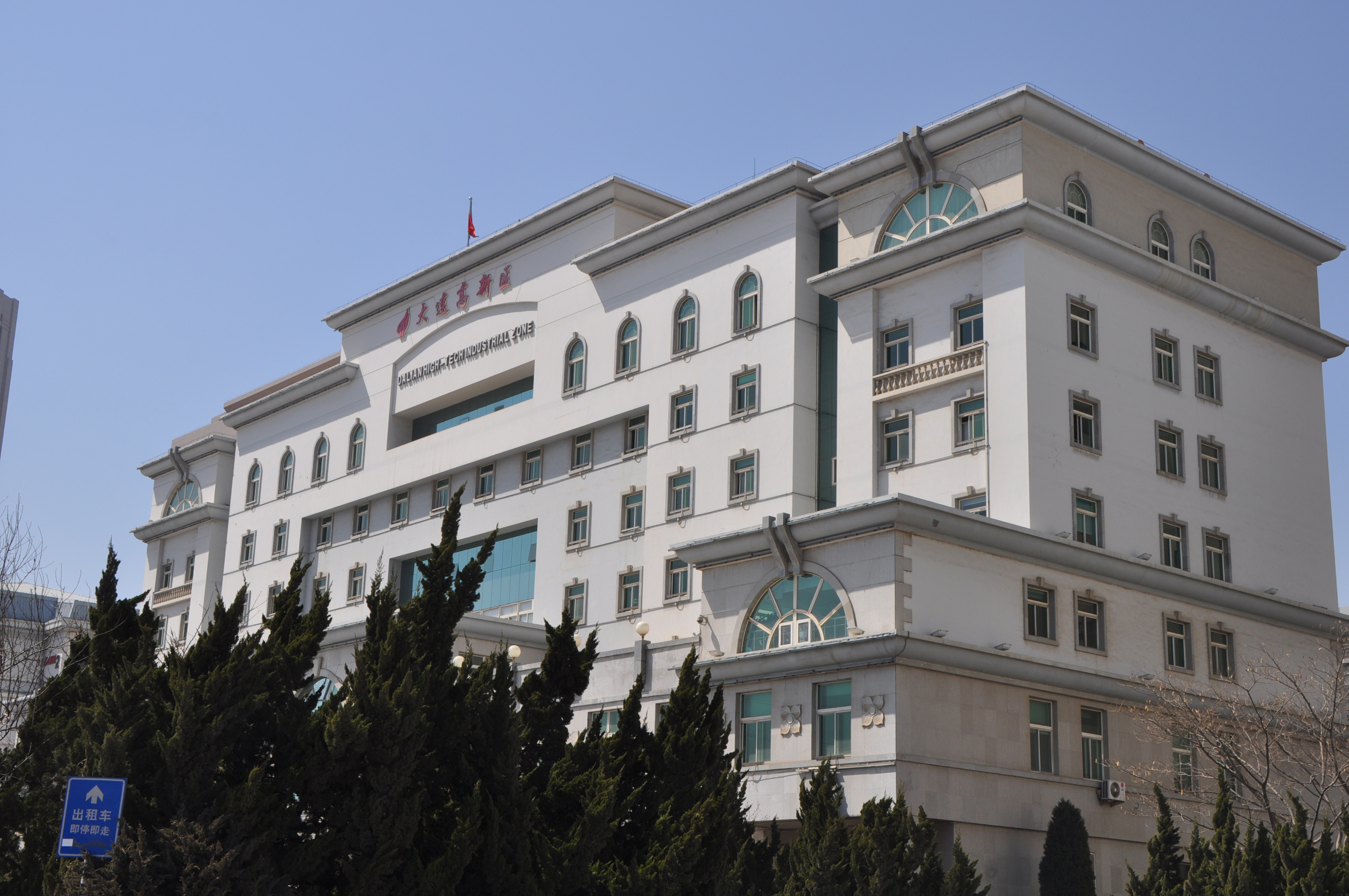
Dalian Hi-tech Zone Administration Bldg.

=== Animation Industry Base ===
- Managed by: Dalian Hi-tech Industrial Zone Digital Entertainment Administrative Office
- 110 companies, including Crystal Digital Technology (水晶石数字科技).

=== Hekou International Software Park ===
- Managed by Hekou Village
- Companies: Yidatec

=== Dalian Ascendas IT Park ===
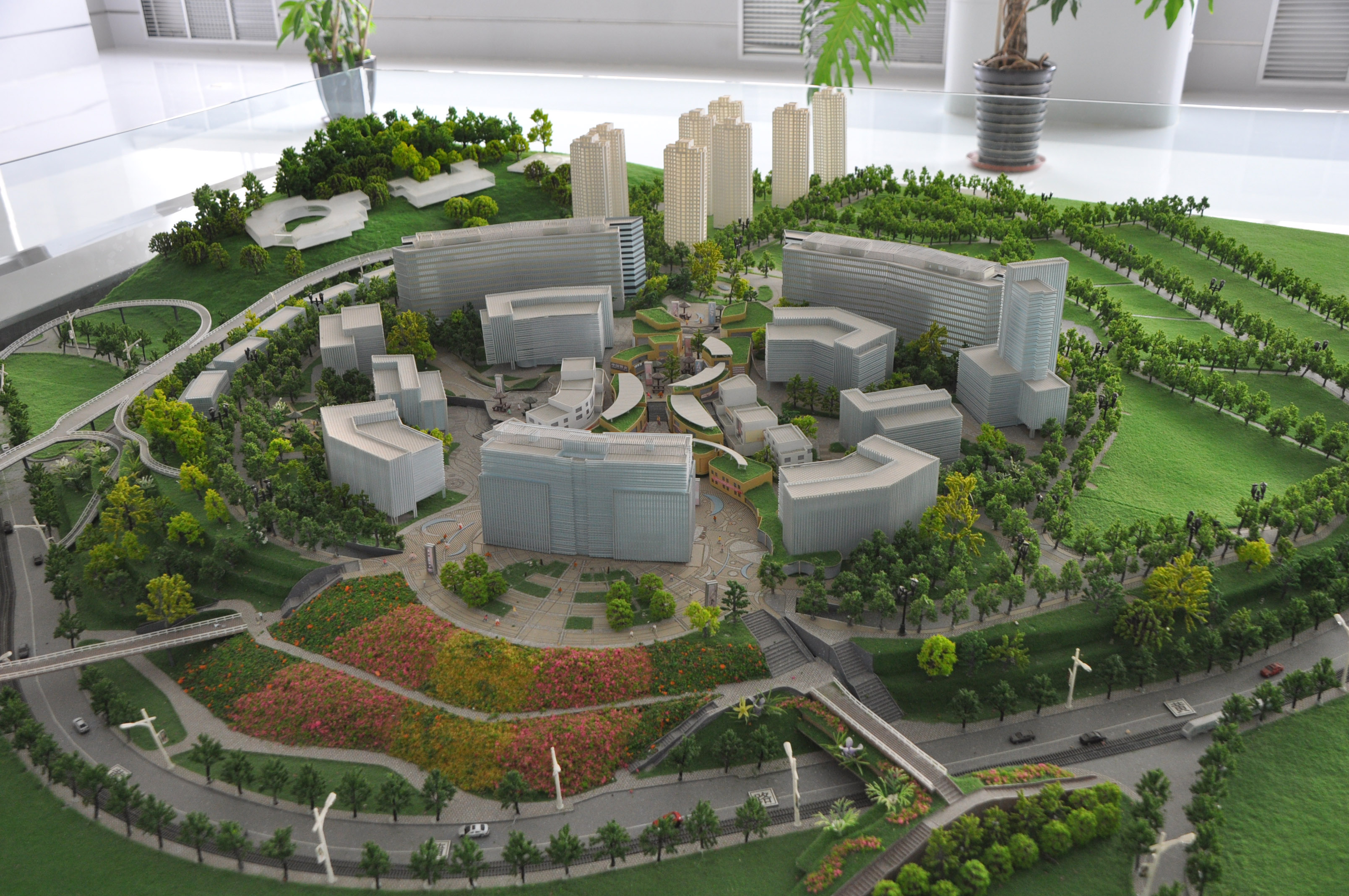
The Dalian Ascendas IT Park Model. Building No. 1 (right) and Building No. 2 (left) in the back are already open. Building No. 3 in front will be open soon.

- Name: Dalian Ascendas IT Park (大连软件园腾飞园区)
- Established: 2007
- Managed by DLSP Ascendas Co., Ltd., a joint venture of Ascendas Corp. of Singapore and Dalian Software Park Co., Ltd.

Address: 1 Huixianyuan, Dalian Hi-tech Zone, Dalian, Liaoning, China (大连市高新园区汇贤园1号)

- Area: 200,000 m² (100,000 m² in No. 1 Building and 100,000 m² in No. 2 Building) See this guide map.
- 59 companies, including CitiBank, Infosys Technologies, Konica Minolta, Omron.
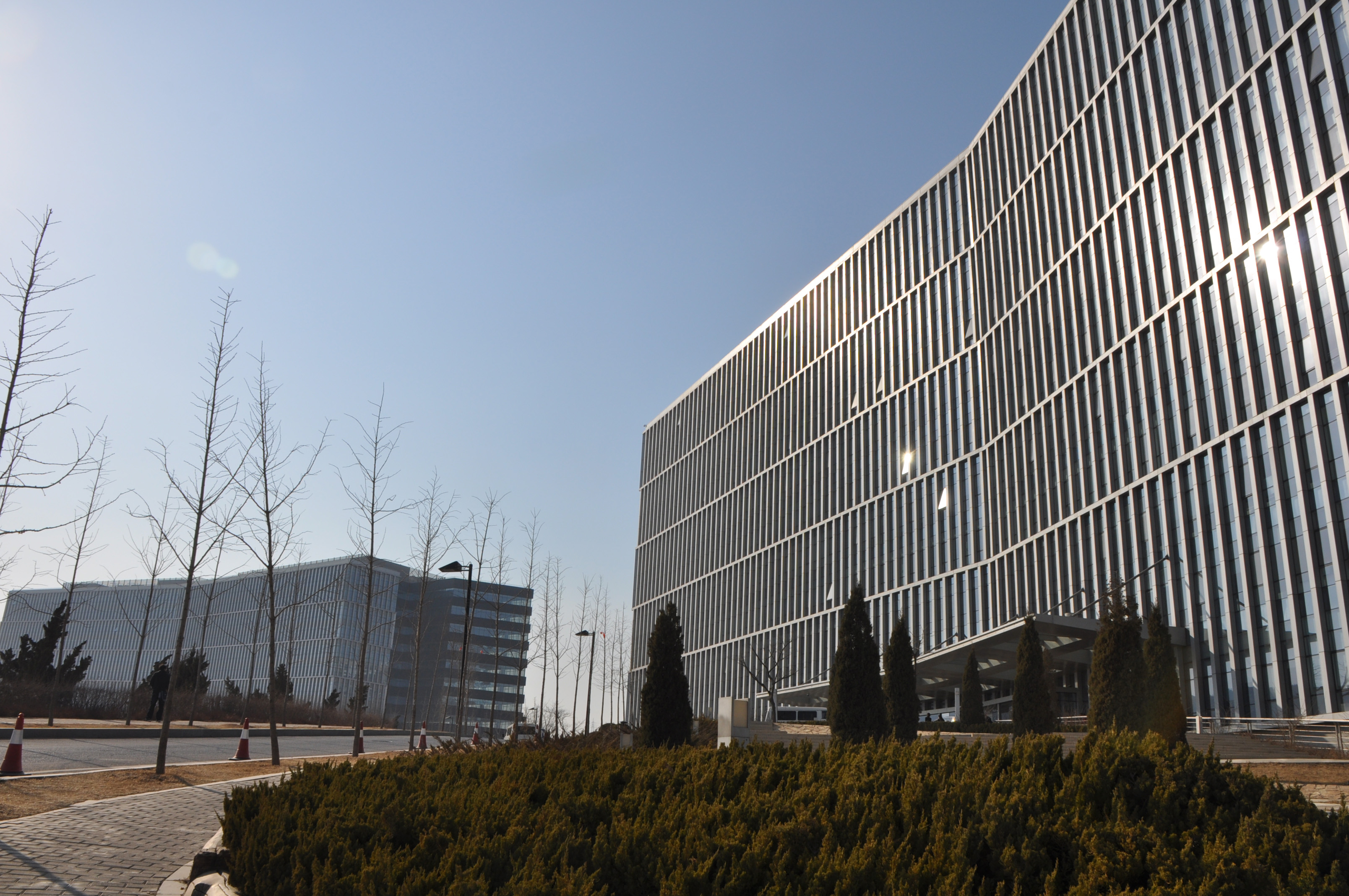
Dalian Ascendas IT Park

=== Neusoft Group International Software Park ===
- Neusoft Group
Lushunkou District

=== Dalian Tiandi Software Park ===
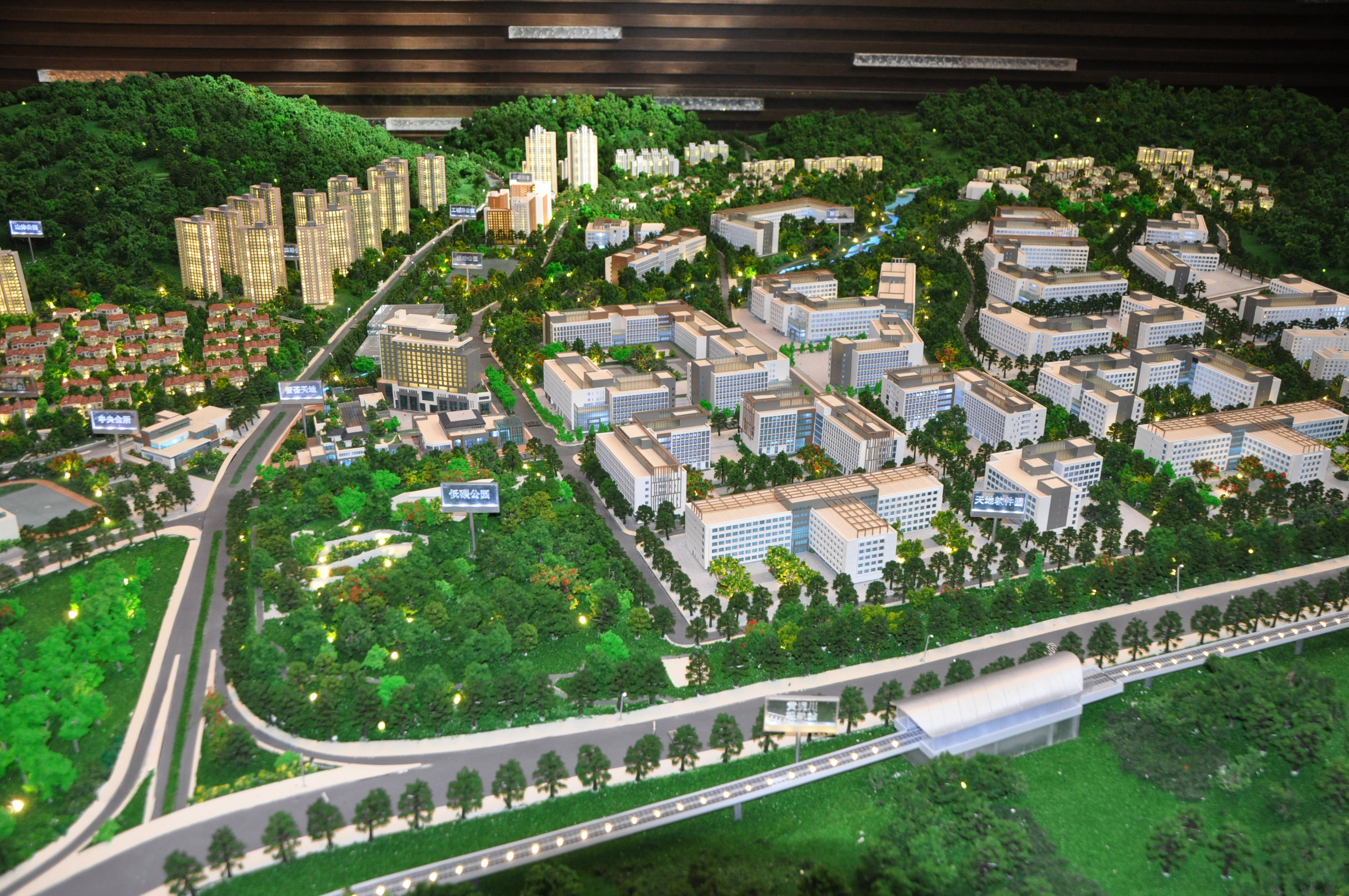
Dalian Tiandi Software Park

- Name: Dalian Tiandi Software Park (大连天地软件园)
- Established: 2010
- Area: Jinhuai Building (30,000 m^{2}). See the area map in Project Introduction (Beware of music!).
- Managed by DLSP Shui On Development Co., Ltd., a joint venture of Shui On Land and Dalian Software Park Co., Ltd.

Address: No. 33, Hongchuan East Rd., Dalian Hi-tech Zone, Dalian, Liaoning, China (大连市高新园区宏川东路33号)

- 13 companies, including IBM (3,000 employees have already moved), Kingsoft, Mitsui Real Estate.
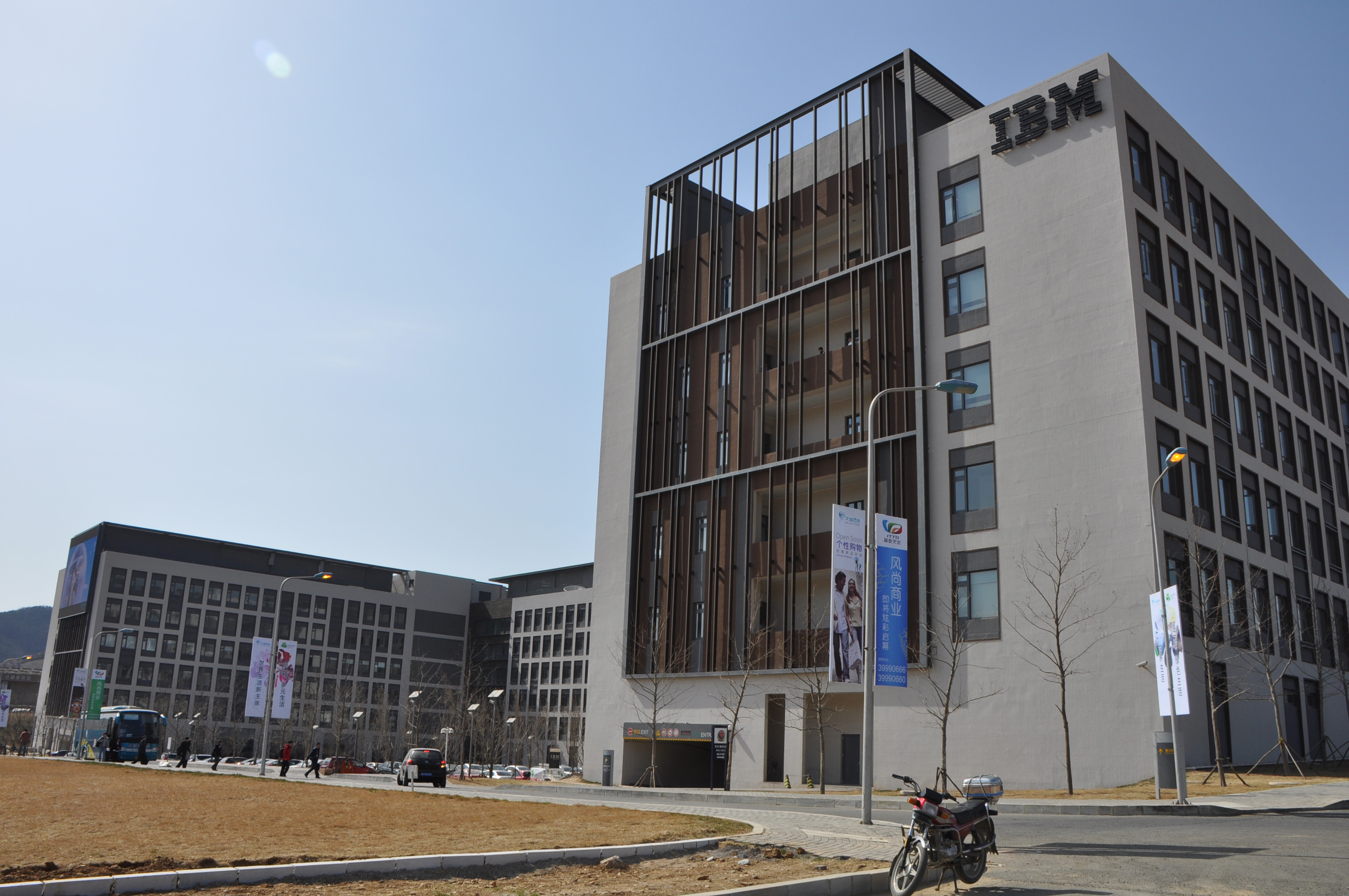
Dalian Tiandi Software Park

=== Yingge Software Park ===
Under construction

Along GuoShui Highway (Guojia - Shuishiying Villages):

=== Longtou Technology Park ===
Under construction

== Transportation ==
- Roads: China National Highway 201 (also called Lushun South Road). 30 minutes by taxi from the hotels on Renming Road, downtown Dalian, to the Dalian Hi-tech Zone Administrative Committee.

City bus: Nos. 3, 10, 28, 531, 802 and other lines
Dalian-Lushun bus: From the north and south exits of Dalian railway station

- Tramway: No. 202 line (Xinggong Street to Xiaopingdaoqian). Being extended via Huangnichuan and Longwangtang to Lüshun New Port.
- Dalian Metro: Line 1, Line 12
- Railway: 30 minutes by taxi from Dalian railway station
- Air: 30 minutes by taxi from Dalian Zhoushuizi International Airport
- Sea: 40 minutes by taxi from Dalian Port. Yacht harbors in Xinghai Square, in front of Dalian Maritime University, and the Xiaopingdao reclaimed area.
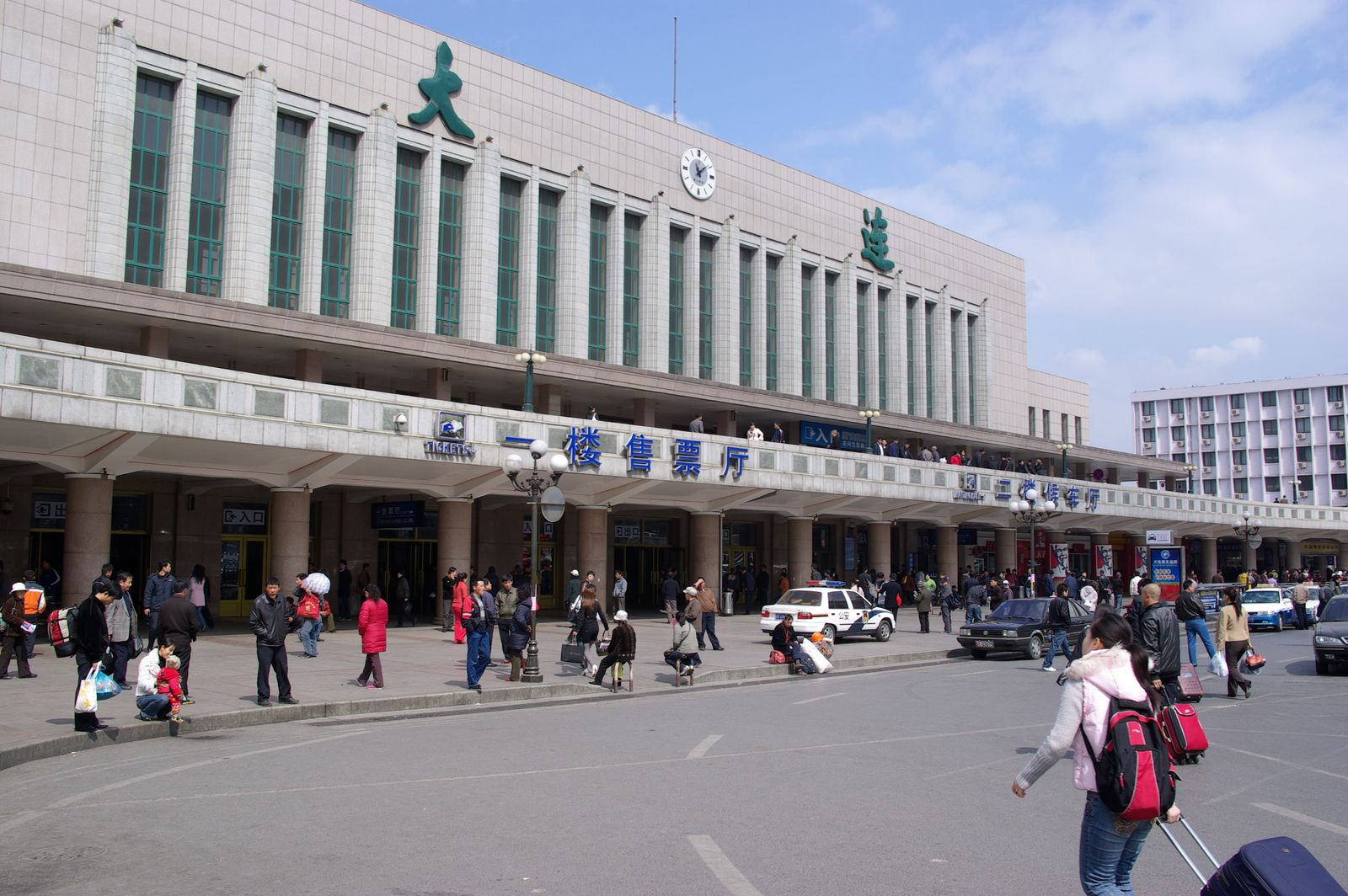
Dalian railway station

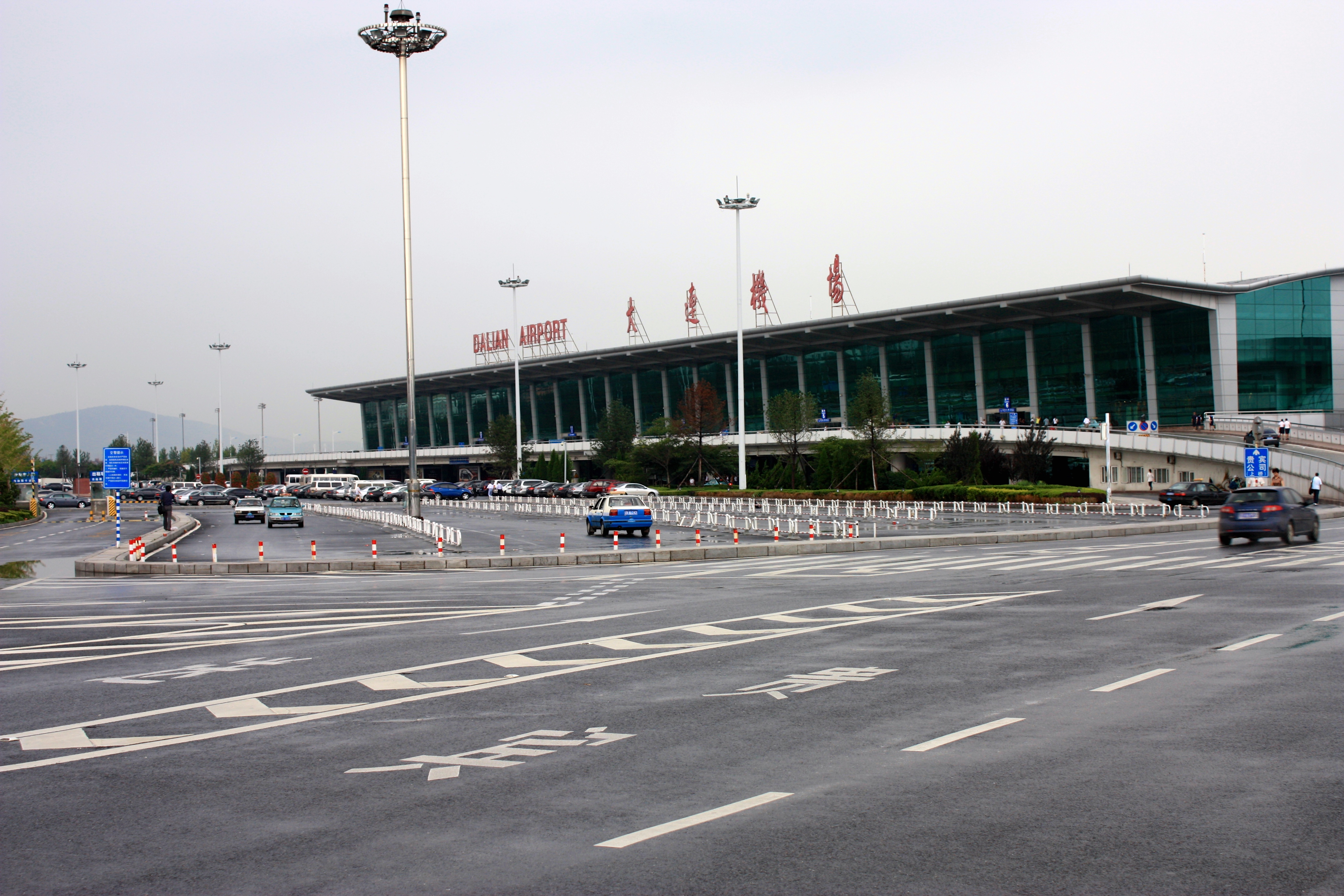
Dalian Zhoushuizi International Airport

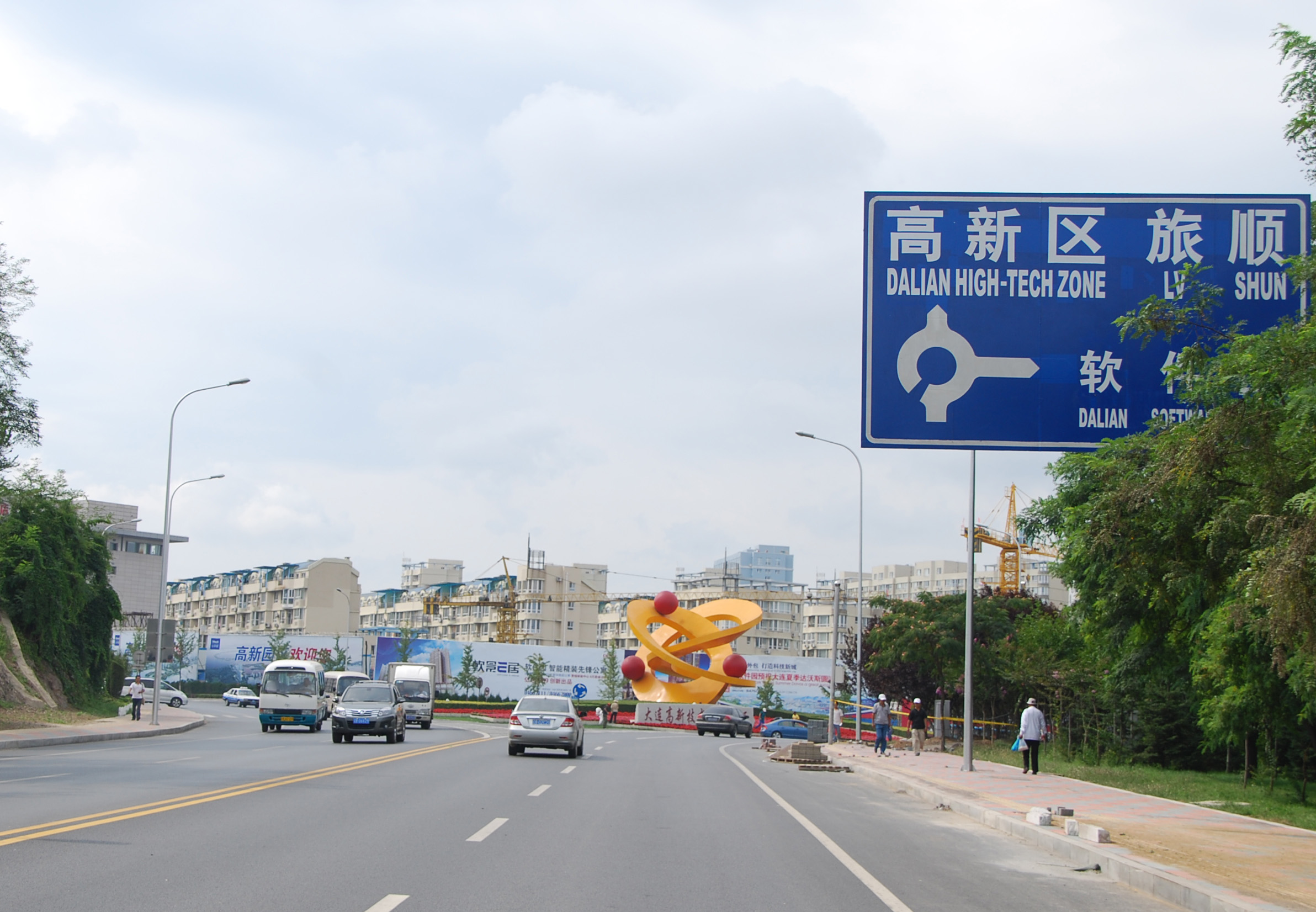
Lushun South Road at Xueyuan Square

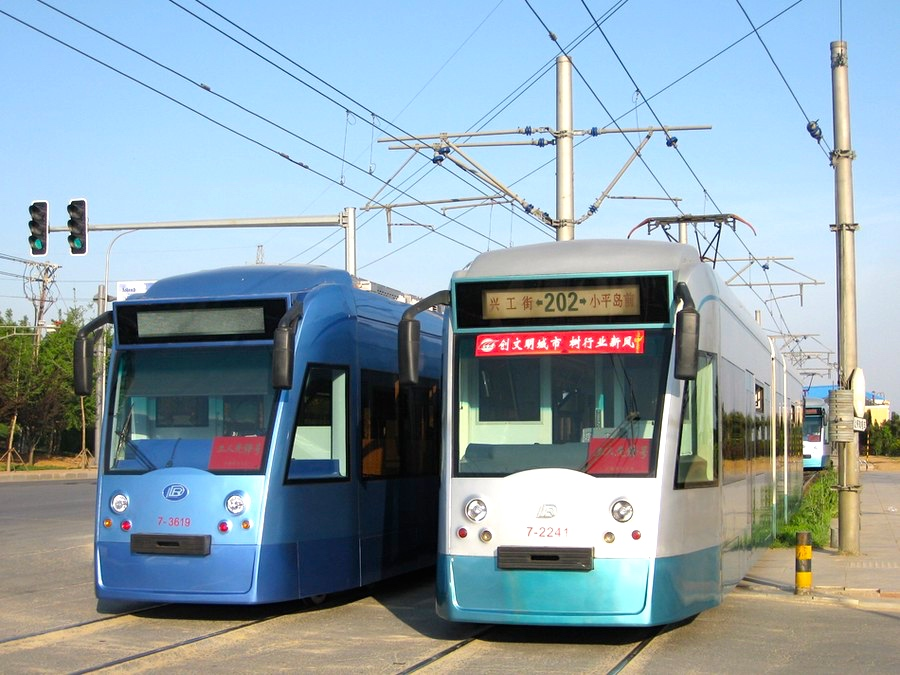
Trams in Dalian - No. 202 Line

== Education ==
There are universities and research centers in this area, where about half of all the universities of Dalian are located. From east to west are:

- Dalian Institute of Chemical Physics
- Dalian Ocean University
- Dongbei University of Finance and Economics (Including Dongbei University of Finance and Economics Press)
- Dalian Neusoft University of Information
- Dalian University of Technology (Including Dalian University of Technology Press)
- Dalian Maritime University
- Dalian University of Foreign Languages
- Dalian Medical University
- Software and IT Service Training Base of Ambow Education Group (安博教育集团), Beijing
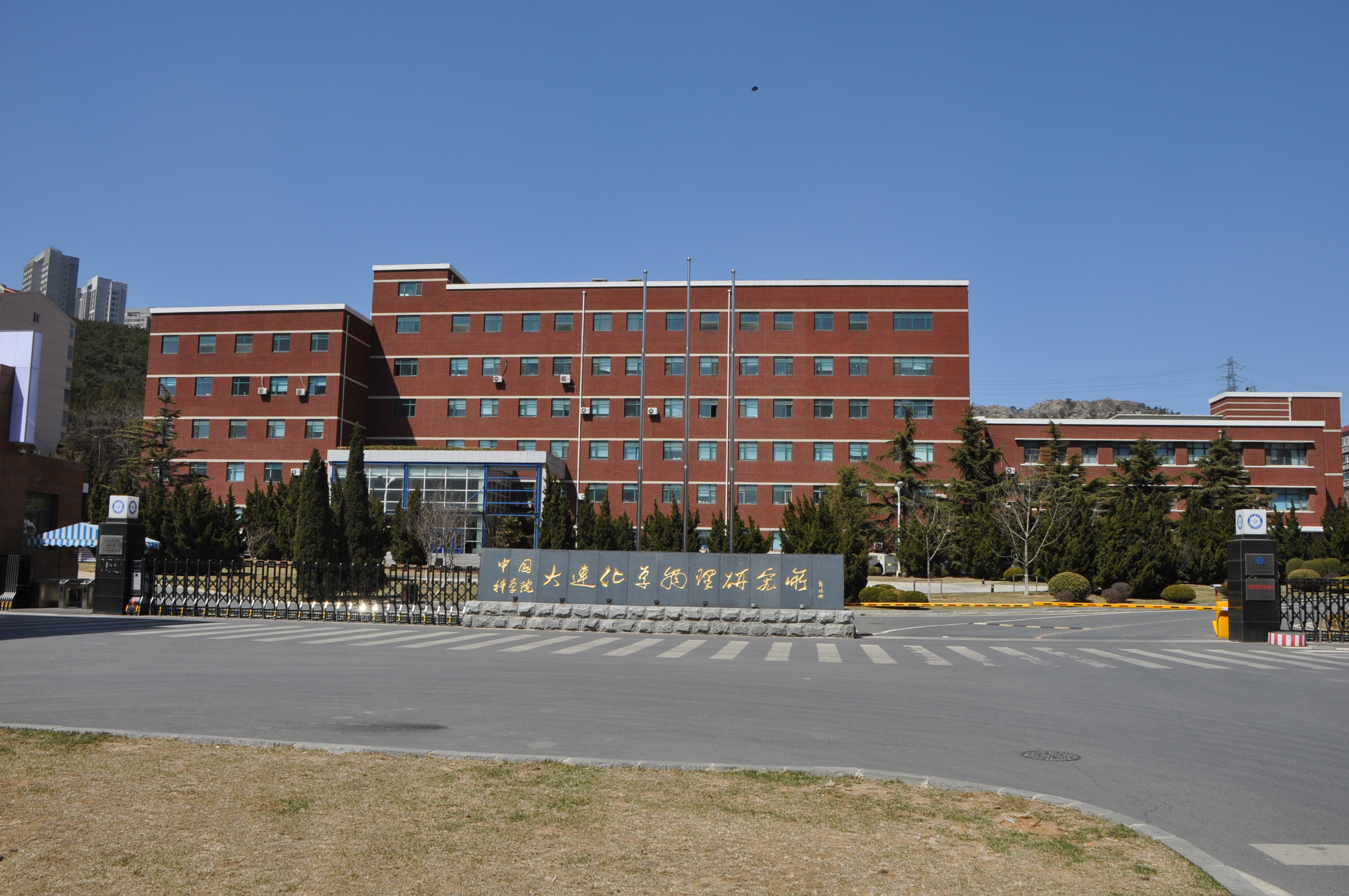
Dalian Institute of Chemical Physics

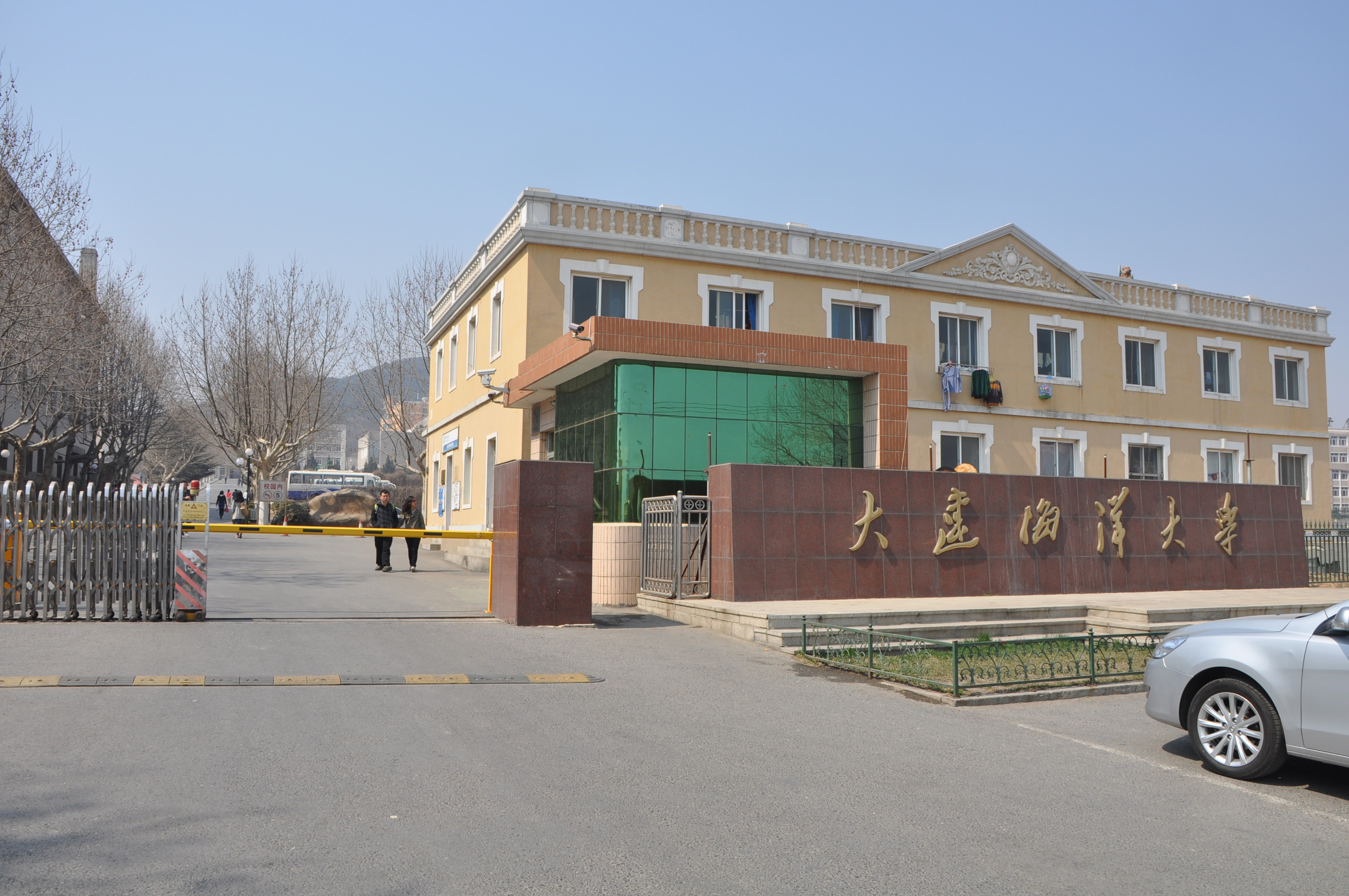
Dalian Ocean University

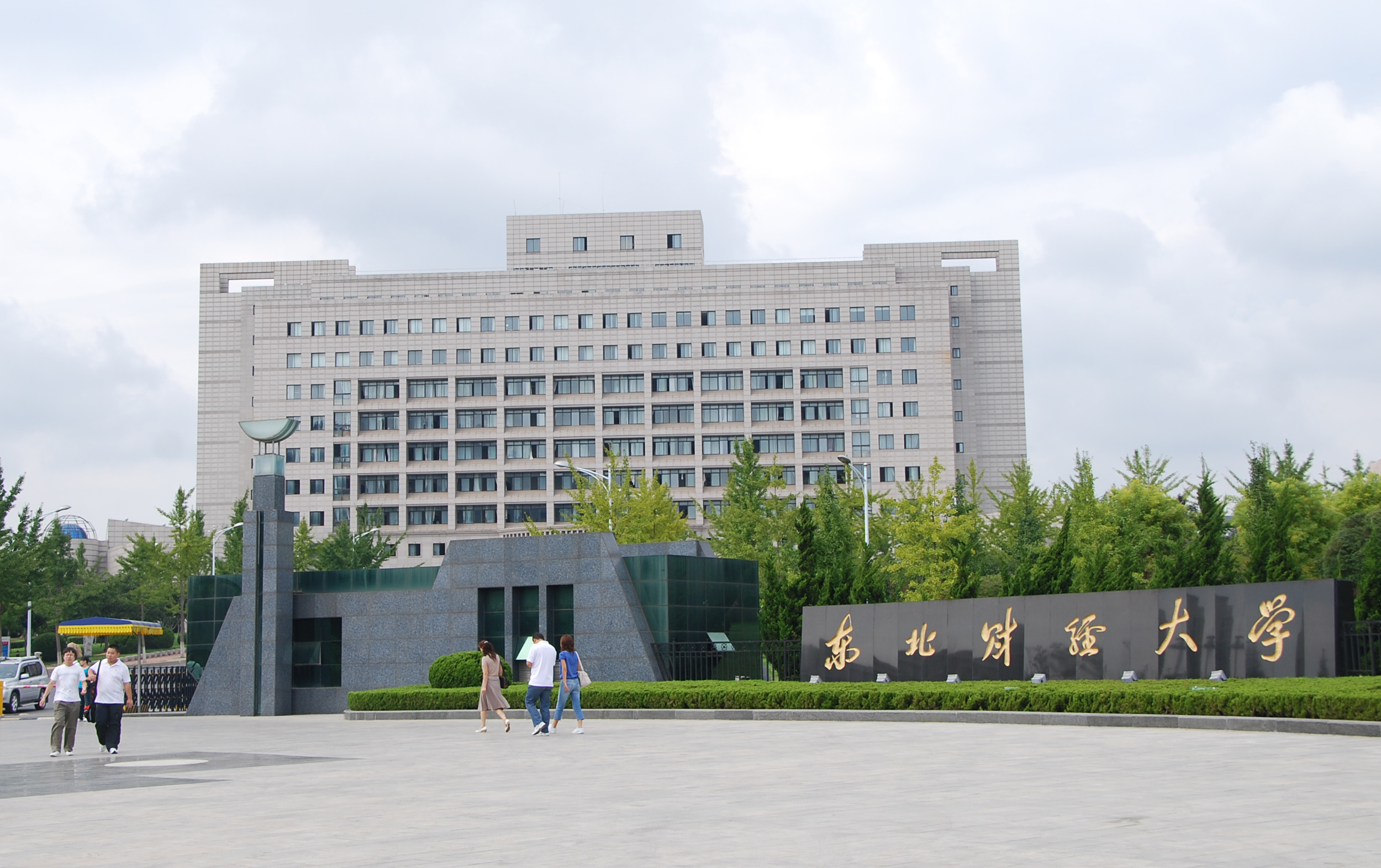
Dongbei University of Finance and Economics

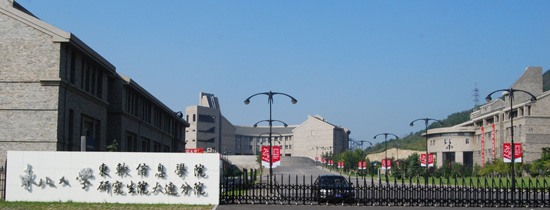
Dalian Neusoft University of Information

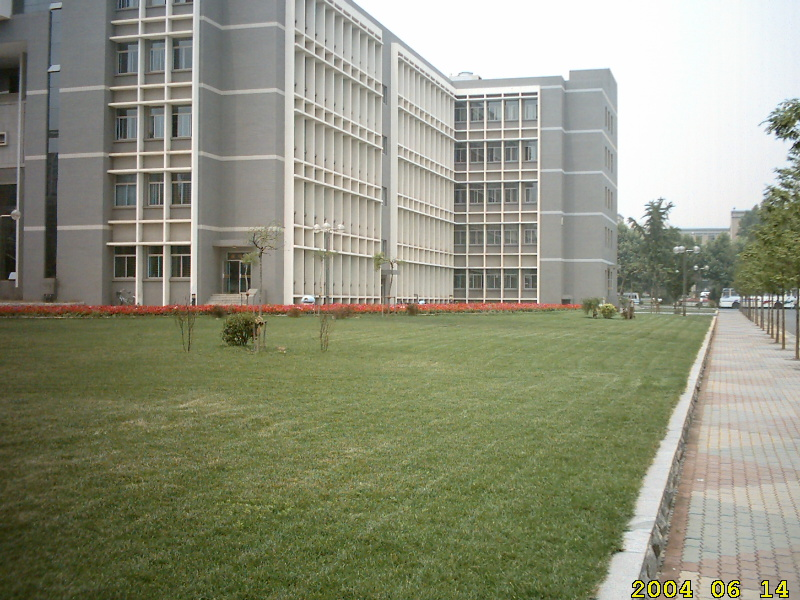
Dalian University of Technology's Library

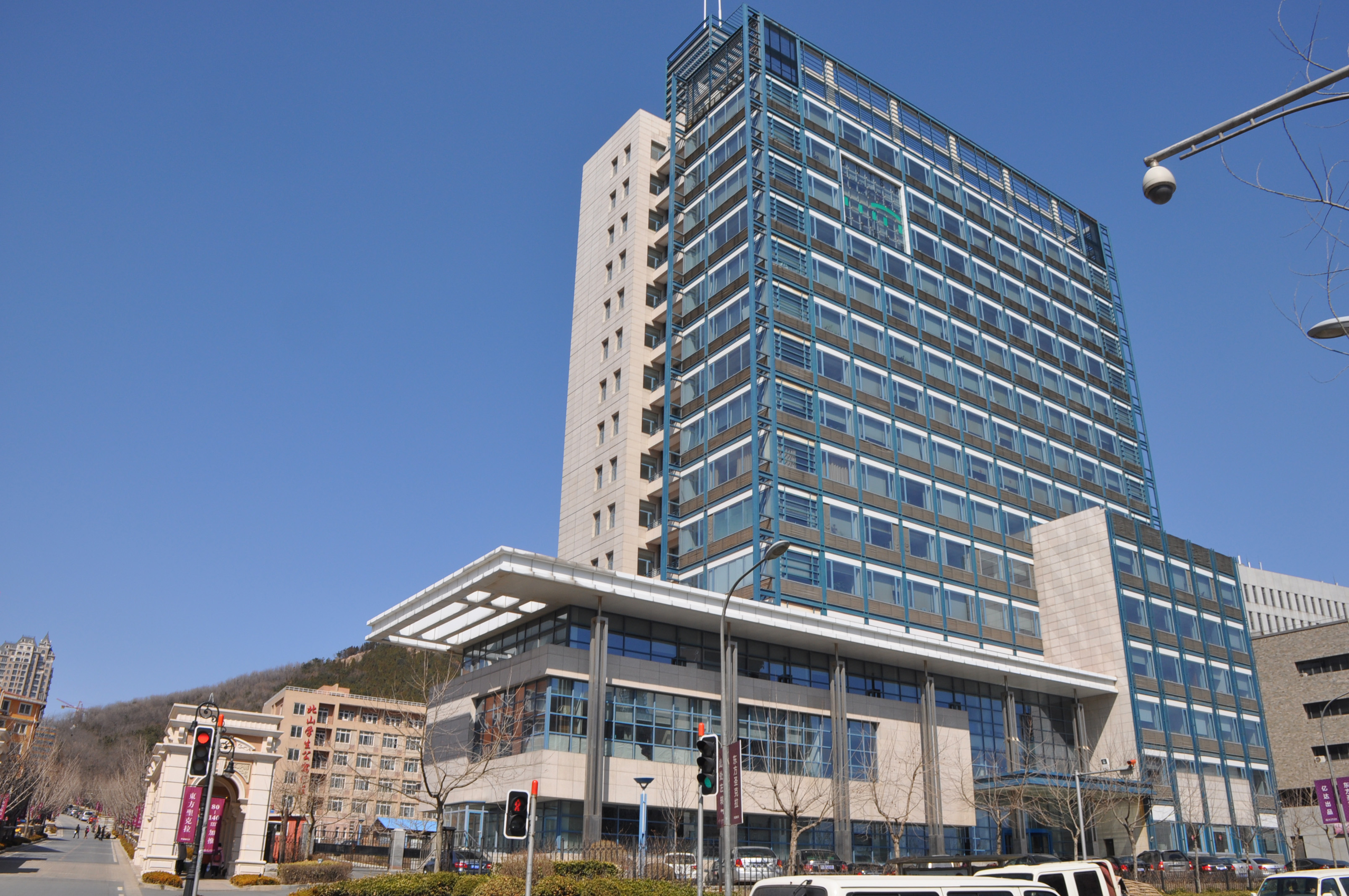
Dalian University of Technology Press

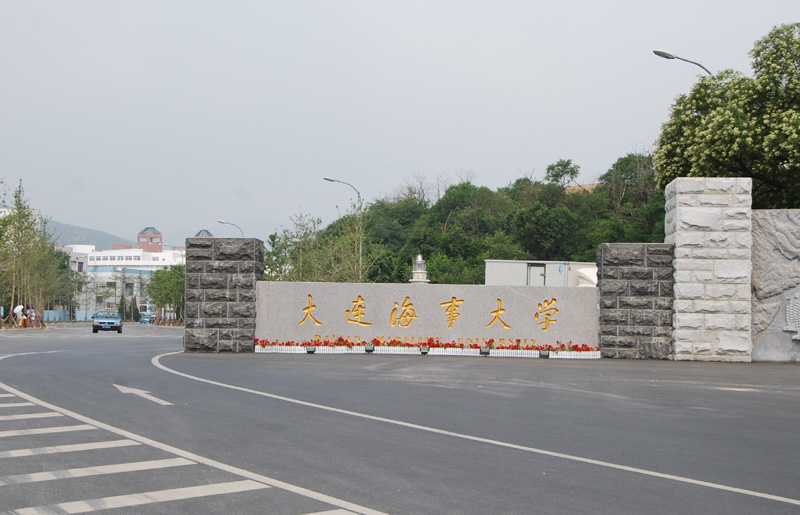
Dalian Maritime University

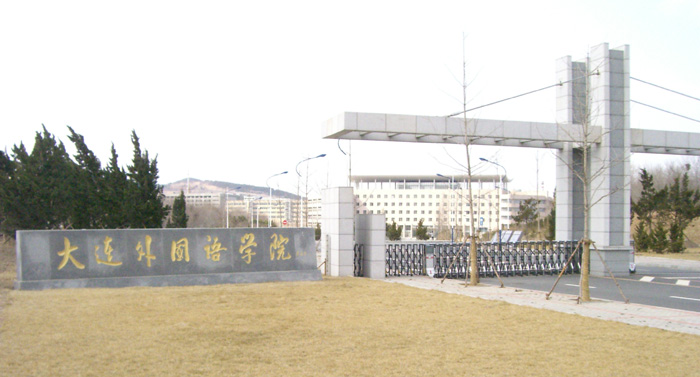
Dalian University of Foreign Languages

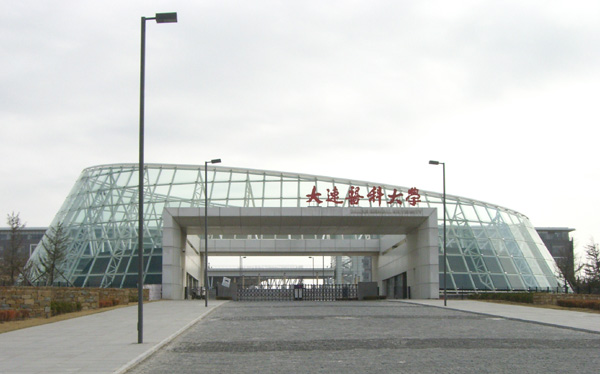
Dalian Medical University

== Accommodation ==
- Downtown and central business district on Renmin Road

Shangri-La, Furama, New World, Ramada, Nikko, Kempinski, Dalian Civil Aviation (Daiwa Royal) and other hotels

- Dalian World Financial Center at Xinghai Square

Grand Hyatt hotel

- Dalian Hi-tech Zone

Heyi Hotel (和颐酒店)

== Local environment ==
=== Restaurants ===
- Many Chinese restaurants (including Maizi Dawang on Shuma Road)
- Western restaurants (including West Coast coffee shop. There are also KFC, McDonald's and Pizza Hut fastfood restaurants.)
- Japanese restaurants (including Momiji and Kappo Shimizu)
- Korean restaurants (including Kaicheng and Shengdao)

=== Cafeterias ===
- Cafeterias in major buildings, run by local Dalianese, as well as British and French catering companies

=== Apartments ===
- More expensive: Residencies at Shangri-La, Furama, Ramada, Nikko, Kempinski and other hotels
- Less expensive: International New Village in Dalian Software Park, Guigu Jiari (Silicon Valley Holiday) on Lushun South Road, etc.

=== Shopping ===
- Hypermarkets: Dashang Group's Newmart in Heishijiao, Walmart on Shuma Road, and Carrefour, Mykal on Xi'an Road Commercial Zone & Qingniwaqiao.

=== Schools ===
In Dalian City, there are:

- Kindergartens
- Municipal Bilingual School (Chinese/English)
- Dalian Maple Leaf International School (English), Japanese School (at Fujiazhuang) and Korean School (in Dalian Development Area)

=== Medical facilities ===
- No. 2 Hospital, attached to Dalian Medical University

=== Recreational areas ===
- Xinghai Square, Xinghai Park, Longwangtang Cherry Blossom Park.
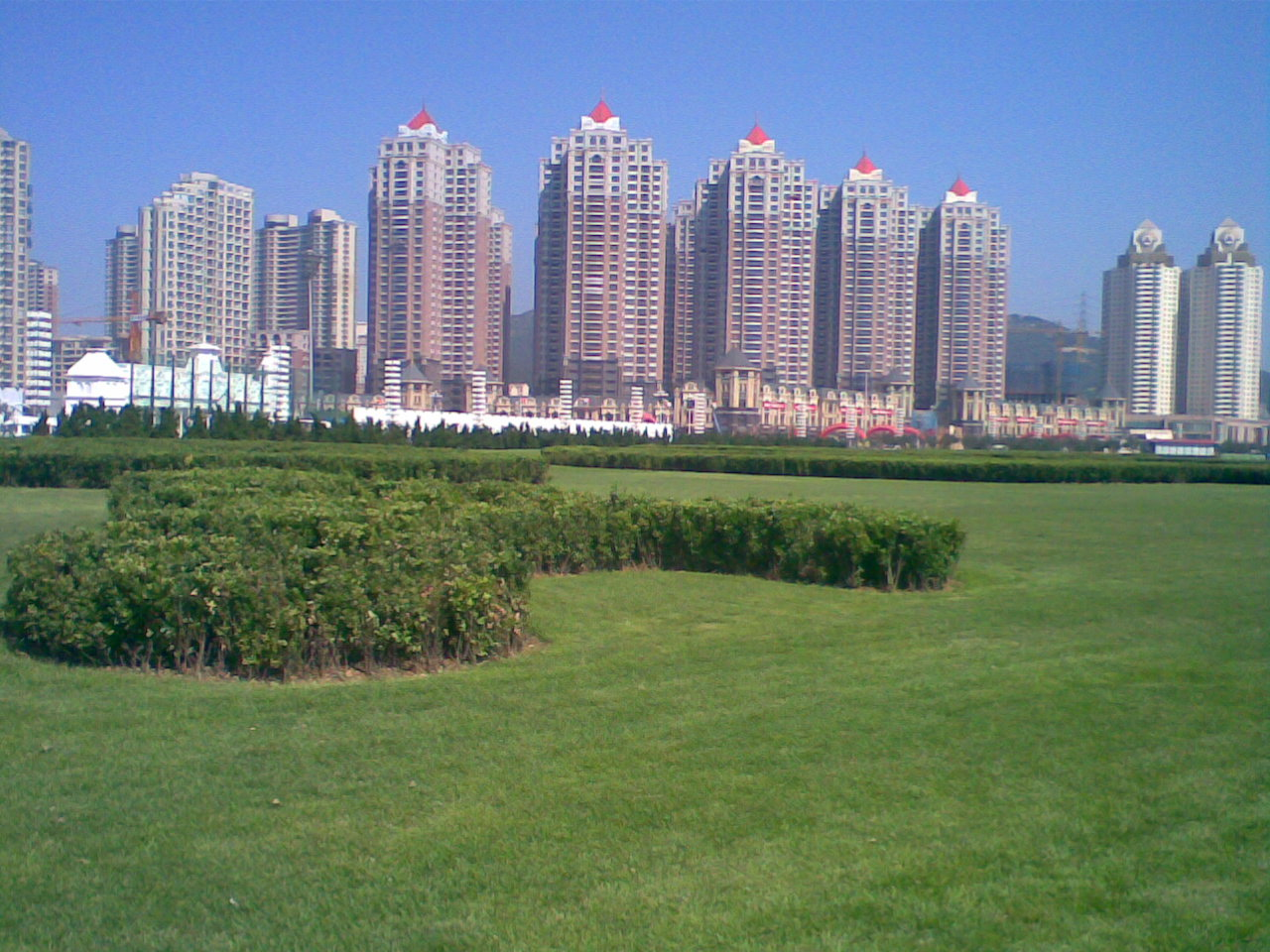
Xinghai Square

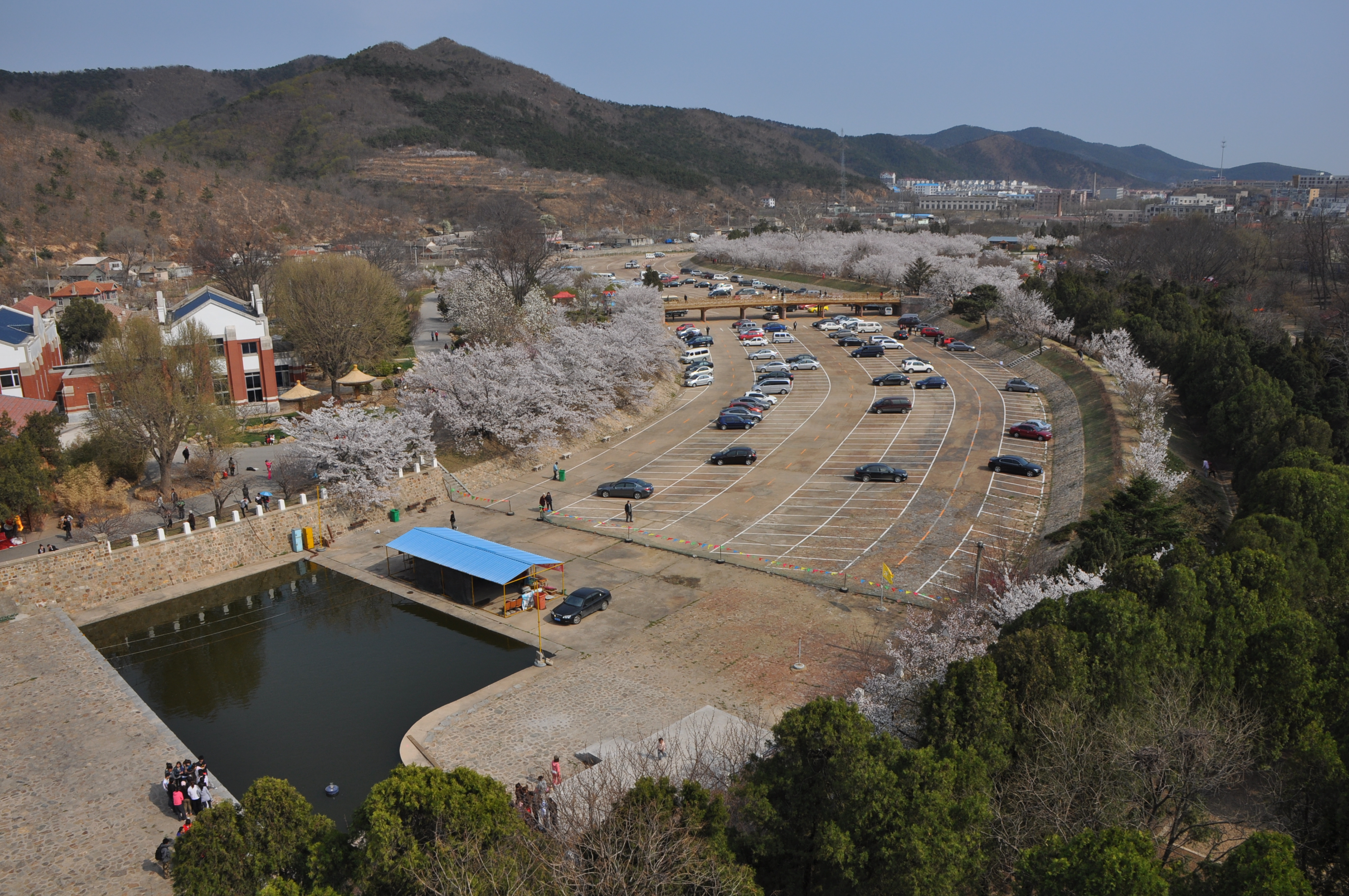
Longwangtang Cherry Blossom Park

== Hi-tech parks in other areas of Dalian ==
There are other parks, often called the "hi-tech zones" of Dalian.

=== Ganjingzi District ===
Dalian BEST City (大连生态科技创新城) is located along Lushun North Road.

=== Jinzhou District ===
New Jinzhou District including Dalian Development Area has DD Port and other hi-tech areas.

== See also ==
- List of technology centers
- Dalian Software Park
