= Economy of Dalian =

The economy of Dalian plays an important part in Northeast China and Northeast Asia.

The city has had a continuous double-digit increase in GDP since 1992. In 2009, the city's GDP registered a 15 percent increase, reaching RMB441.77 billion, while per capita GDP hit RMB71,833. According to a nationwide appraisal by the National Bureau of Statistics, Dalian ranks eighth among Chinese cities in terms of overall strength. The city's main industries include machine manufacturing, petrochemicals and oil refining, and electronics.

The city is also striving to build up an IT and software center. Finance and other service industries are growing as well. As of 2006, 21 foreign-funded banks and financial institutions have set up branches or agencies in the city. Dalian's Xinghai Convention and Exhibition Center has hosted over 300 events, including the Dalian Import and Export Commodities Fair and Dalian International Garment Fair.

== Heavy, light and distribution industries ==
Even before and during the Sino-Japanese War, the shipbuilding and locomotives industries were a thriving industry, such as the companies which later became Dalian Shipbuilding Co. and Dalian Locomotive & Rolling Stock Works (DLoco). After the War, Dalian became an important center of the heavy and light industries, including companies such as Dalian Heavy Industry Co., Dalian Chemical Group, and Wafangdian Bearing Co.; and of the distribution industry, including such as Dashang Group. Overseas retailing giants, such as Wal-Mart from the US., Carrefour from France and Metro from Germany have opened stores in Dalian.

Dalian Port is emerging as a very important port for international trade. A new harbor for oil tankers, at the terminus of an oil pipeline from the Daqing oilfields, was completed in 1976. Dalian is the 6th largest port in China.

Accordingly, Dalian is a major center for oil refineries, diesel engineering, and chemical production. Also completed recently is a newer port on Dagushan Peninsula on the northern suburbs, specializing in import/export of mining and oil products. Together with its Dalian Railroad Station, Dalian International Airport and two major express roads to Shenyang (Shenda Expressway)-Changchun (Changda Expressway)-Harbin (Hada Expressway) in the north and to Dandong to the east, Dalian has become an important distribution center.

== Industrial zones ==
Dalian has been given many benefits by the PRC government, including the title of "open-city" (1984), which allows it to receive considerable foreign investment (see Special Economic Zone). The Development Zone was established in Jinzhou District, to which many Japanese manufacturing companies, such as Canon, Mitsubishi Electric, Nidec, Sanyo Electric and Toshiba, followed by Korean, American and European companies (such as Pfizer). In March 2007, Intel announced plans to build a semiconductor fabrication facility (commonly known as a fab) in the Development Zone, Dalian. It is Intel's first fab to be built at an entirely new site in over 15 years. The fab at Dalian will make the chip sets that support Intel's microprocessors and is expected to begin operation in the first half of 2010. (Source: The Wall Street Journal; 26 March 2007; Page B6)

Other zones in the city include the Dalian Economic and Technological Development Zone, Dalian Export Processing Zone, Dalian Free Trade Zone, and Dalian Hi-Tech Industrial Development Zone.

Dalian Economic & Technological Development Zone was established in September 1984, as one of the first of the China National Economic and Technological Development Zones. The zone had a GDP of 70.31 billion yuan in 2007 and the total volume of import and export trade is 14.92 billion dollars, which accounts for a quarter of the whole Liaoning Province's. Most of the enterprises in Dalian ETDZ are factories foreign enterprises, especially from Japan, South Korea and USA, such as Canon, Pfizer, Toshiba and Intel.

Dalian Export Processing Zone

Dalian Export Processing Zone was approved to be set up by State Council in April 2000, with a planned area of 2.95 km^{2}. It is divided into two parts, A zone and B zone. A zone has a construction area of 1.5 km^{2}, and started operation in May 2001. All the basic infrastructure are available, which include road, water, gas, and power supply, telecommunication and so on. In A zone, it encourages several leading industries, such as home appliances, light industry, machinery, construction materials, medicine instruments.

- Dalian Free Trade Zone

Dalian Free Trade Zone was approved to be set up by government in May 1992. Investors can enjoy preferential policies, including duty-free. Inside the zone, all the infrastructures are available. The trade zone enjoys strategic location and convenient traffic. It has formed some leading industries, such as electronics, machinery and plastics.

- Dalian Hi-Tech Industrial Development Zone

Dalian Hi-Tech Industrial Development Zone was approved to be a national-level development zone in 1991. It has a total area of 35.6 square kilometers. Inside the zone, all the infrastructure are available. It focuses and encourages the following industries: electronic information, bio-pharmacy, and new materials.

== Financial industry ==
Dalian is the financial center of Northeast China. There are the Dalian branches of China's five major banks: Bank of China, Industrial & Commercial Bank of China, China Construction Bank, Bank of Communications, and Agricultural Bank of China. Dalian Commercial Bank is now called Dalian Bank, which among other things handles processing of the Dalian Mingzhu IC Card for public transportation.

Dalian Commodity Exchange is the only one of its kind in China, expanding the futures market beyond soybeans.

== IT industry ==
Since the 1990s, Dalian City has emphasized the development of the IT industry, especially in Dalian Hi-Tech Zone and Dalian Software Park in the western suburbs near Dalian University of Technology. Not only Chinese IT companies, such as DHC, Hisoft and Neusoft Group, but also American, European, Indian and Japanese IT companies are located there. Currently, the "Lushun South Road Software Industry Belt" Plan is proceeding, including Dalian Software Park Phase 2.

Dalian has recently become an important center for information technology offshoring and business process outsourcing, similar to Bangalore in India; the city was described in "The World Is Flat" by Thomas Friedman (2007). In another way, Dalian is the forerunner of China's "Re-Development of the Old Industry Bases in Northeast" National Project, which began in 2002.

Intel's Fab 68 is located in Dalian. The plan was announced on 26 March 2007, and operations started on 26 October 2010. It is Intel's first chip-manufacturing fabrication in East Asia.

== Effects of economic growth ==
Whilst economic growth has brought increased wealth to the city, there have been some notable environmental impacts. Most notably Chinese's worst oil spill in recorded history that occurred in 2010.
