= Lushun South Road =

Road in Dalian, China

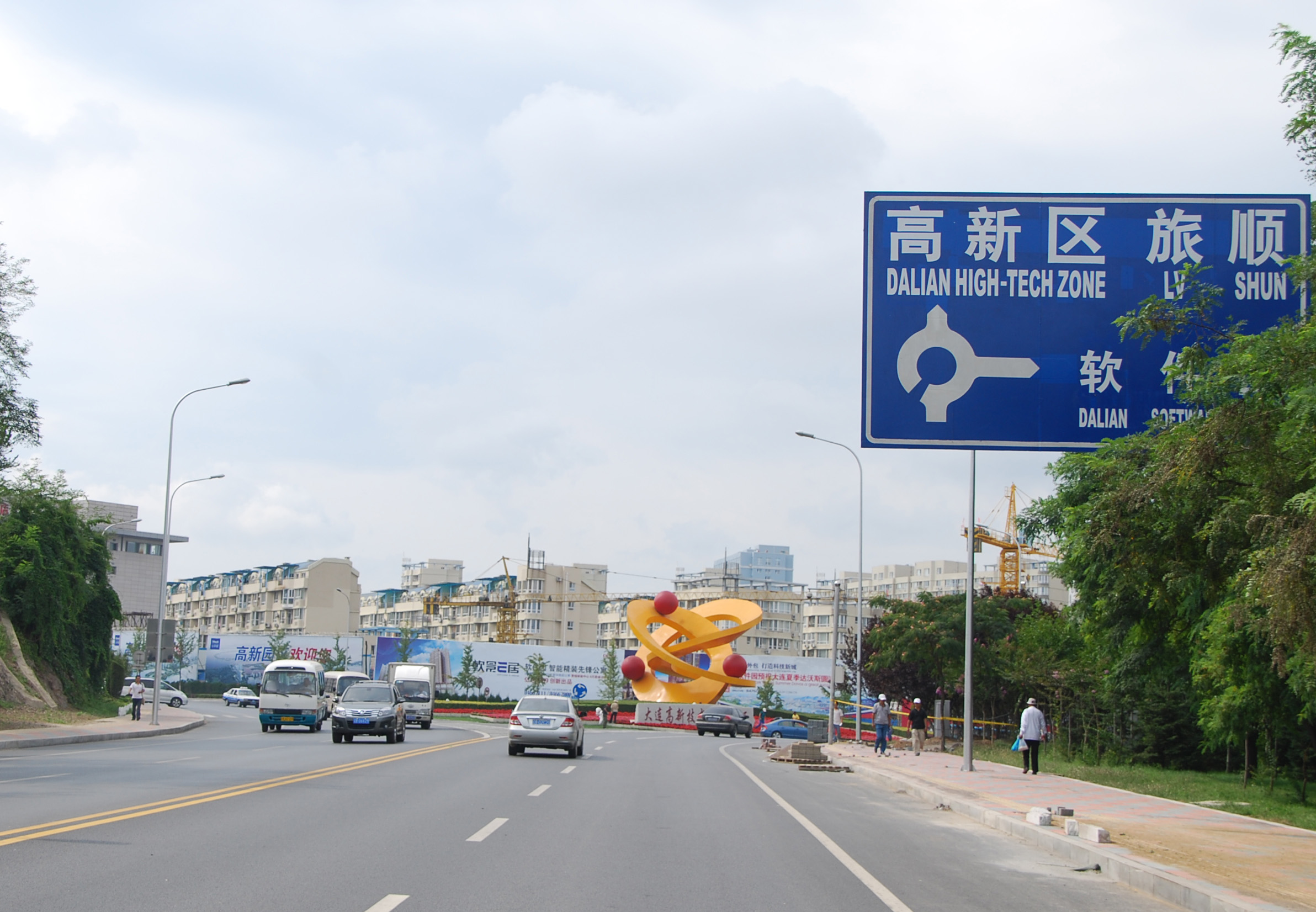
Coming to Academic Square, immediately after starting along Lushun South Road from Heishijiao.

Lüshun South Road (Chinese: 旅顺南路) is one of the three highways connecting the Naval Port in Lüshunkou District of Dalian, Liaoning, China, with the city's downtown core. It is the last part of China National Highway 202, which runs from Hegang to Lüshun via Jiamusi, Tonghua and Dandong, and is about 32 kilometers long.

== General ==
During the time when the southern half of the present-day administrative region of Dalian was Japan's leased territory, three strategic highways were developed between Lushun and downtown Dalian:

- Lushun North Road

From Lushun to the north, via Shuishiying, then heading east, parallel to the Bohai Sea coast, via Dalian Zhoushuizi International Airport to downtown Dalian

- Lushun Middle Road

From Lushun to the northeast, through the mountains, via Huanghe Road to downtown Dalian

- Lushun South Road

From Lushun, via Baiyin Mountain Tunnel, along the Yellow Sea coast, to downtown Dalian

Lushun South Road is the most beautiful highway of the three, and passes through the livelier area of the city. It is about 32 kilometers long, and is the past part of China National Highway 202.

=== Tunnels ===
On Lushun South Road, there are two tunnels. The tunnels to the direction of Lushun were completed during the Japanese period as one lane roads, while the tunnels to the direction of Dalian were made in the 21st century as two lane roads.

- Huangnichuan Tunnel (1,330 meters, in the direction of Dalian)
- Baiyin Mountain Tunnel (390 meters, in the direction of Dalian)

== Along the road from Dalian to Lushun ==
- Heishiqiao
- Dongbei University of Finance and Economics and Xueyuan Square (turning to left here will come to Dalian Software Park)
- Dalian Maritime University
- Dalian Hi-Tech Zone
- Hekou Village and Xiaopingdao
- Dalian Software Park Phase 2 (Ascendas IT Park, Neusoft Group International Park and Dalian Tiandi Software Park)
- Huangnichuan Village
- Huangnichuan Dam and Huangnichuan Tunnel
- Longwangtang Subdistrict (turning to left here will come to Longwangtang Cherry Blossom Park, famous for its cherry trees that come into full bloom in late April)
- Guojia Village, Tahewan Beach and Blue Bay Resort (turning right here and going on Guoshui Highway, will come to Shuishiying)
- Dalian Medical University and Dalian University of Foreign Languages
- Baiyin Mountain Tunnel
- Downtown Lushun and Baiyu Hill

The Modern Photo Album:

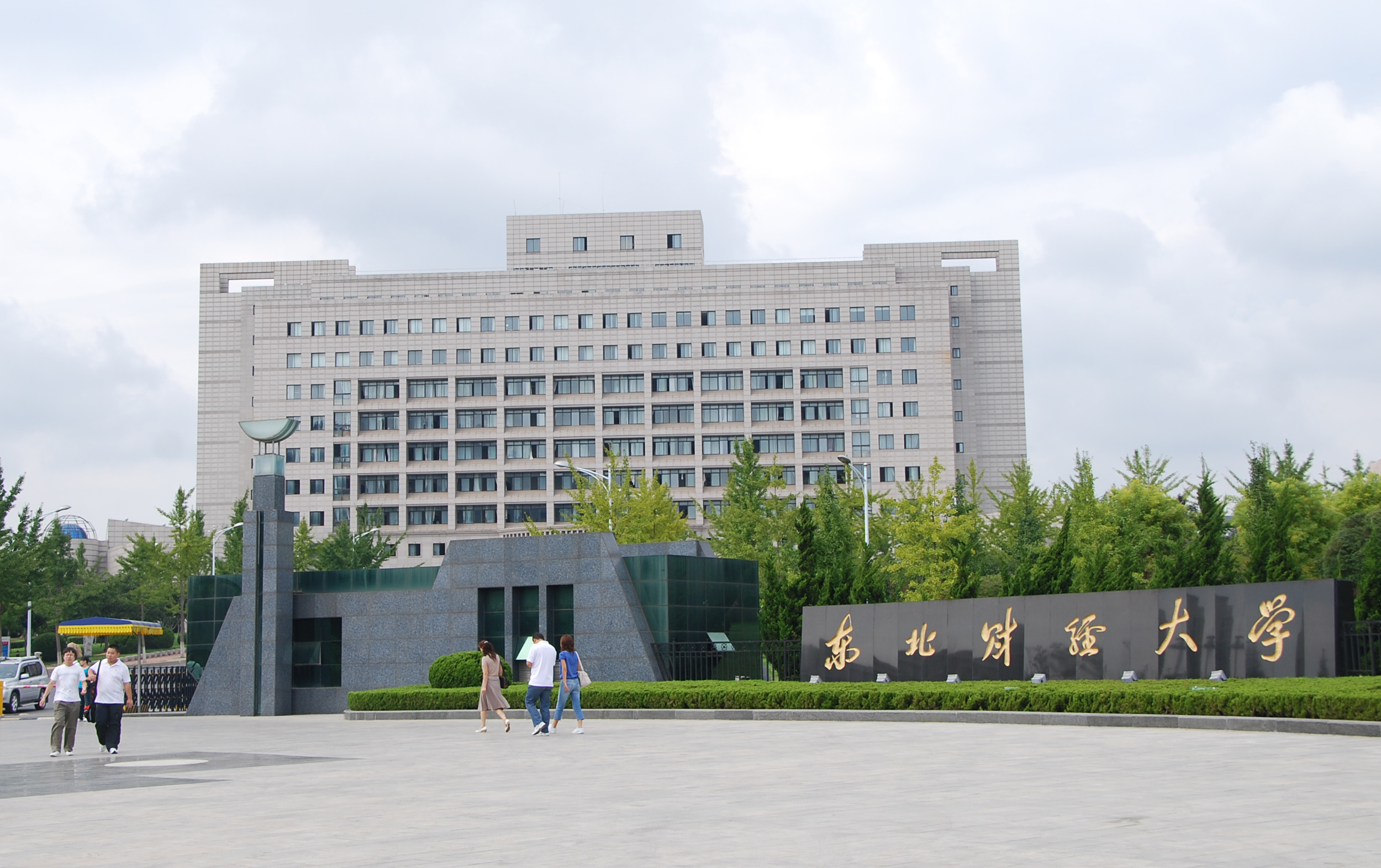
Dongbei University of Finance and Economics

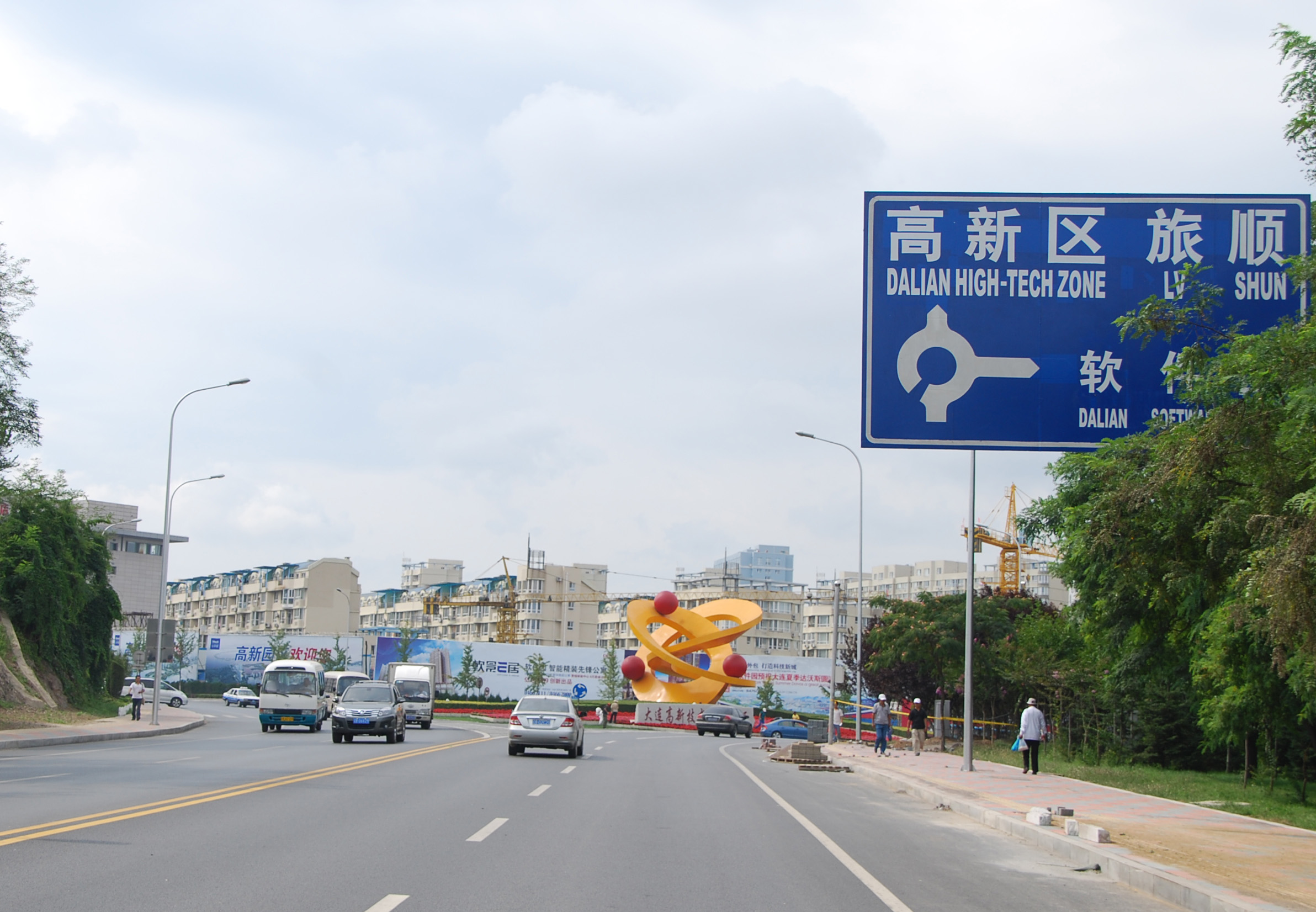
Academic Square (学苑广场)

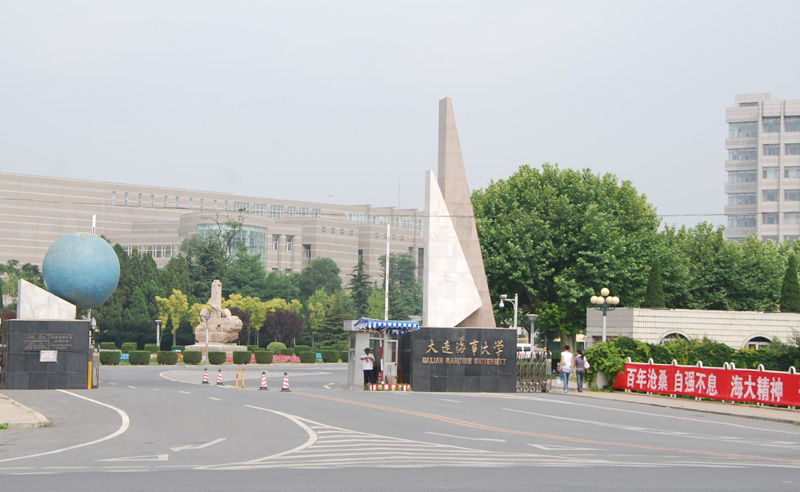
Dalian Maritime University's Old Gate

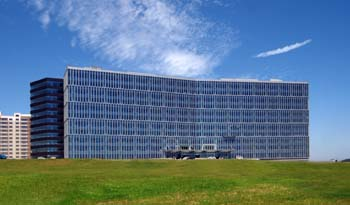
Ascendas IT Park of Dalian Software Park

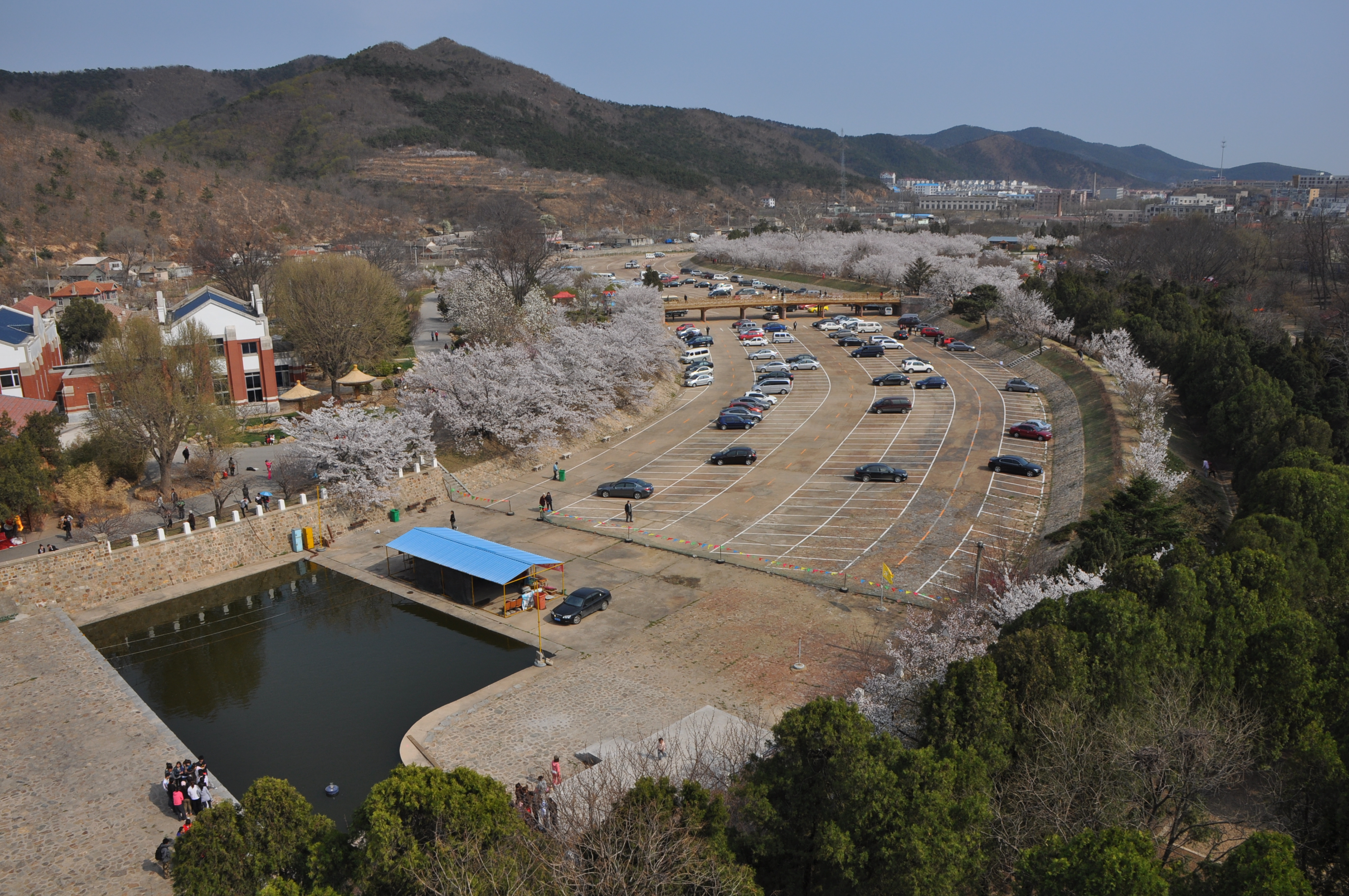
Longwangtang Cherry Blossom Park

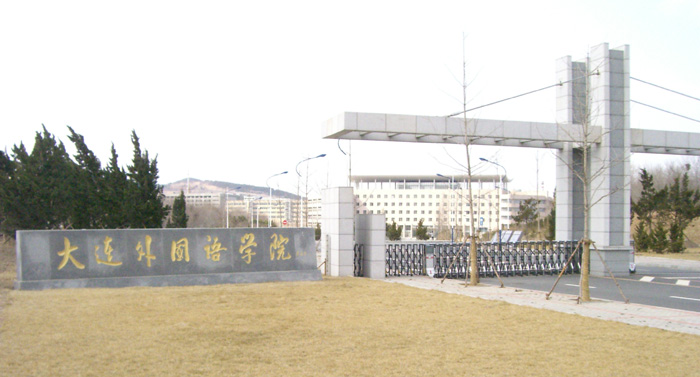
Dalian University of Foreign Languages' Lushun Campus

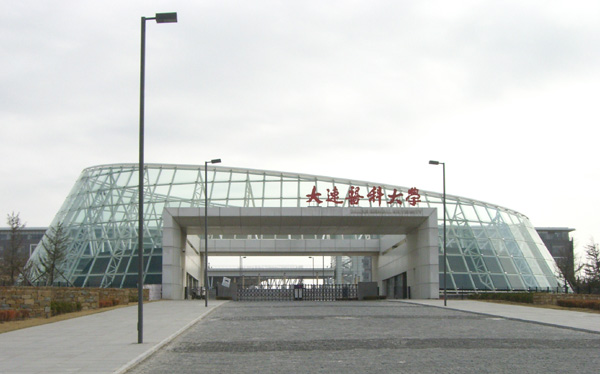
Dalian Medical University, Lushun

== Eight Picturesque Points ==
From the time of the leased territory, the "Eight Picturesque Points of Lushun and Dalian" (in Chinese and Japanese: 旅大八景) along Lushun South Road have been known.

- Star Beach (Star and Sea Park, now)
- Heishijiao
- Lingshui Temple (near Dalian Maritime University, now)
- Xiaopingdao
- Caidaling
- Longwangtang (near Longwangtang Cherry Blossom Park)
- Pebble Beach (Tahewan & Lanwan, now)
- Baiyin Mountain

== See also ==
- Dalian
- Lushun
- Eight Views
