= P.J. Marcellino =

Portuguese-Canadian filmmaker

- Born: Pedro José-Marcelino; 24 October 1978 (age 47); Lisbon, Portugal
- Citizenship: Canada, Portugal
- Education: Seneca College
- Occupations: Film director film producer journalist
- Years active: 2007–present

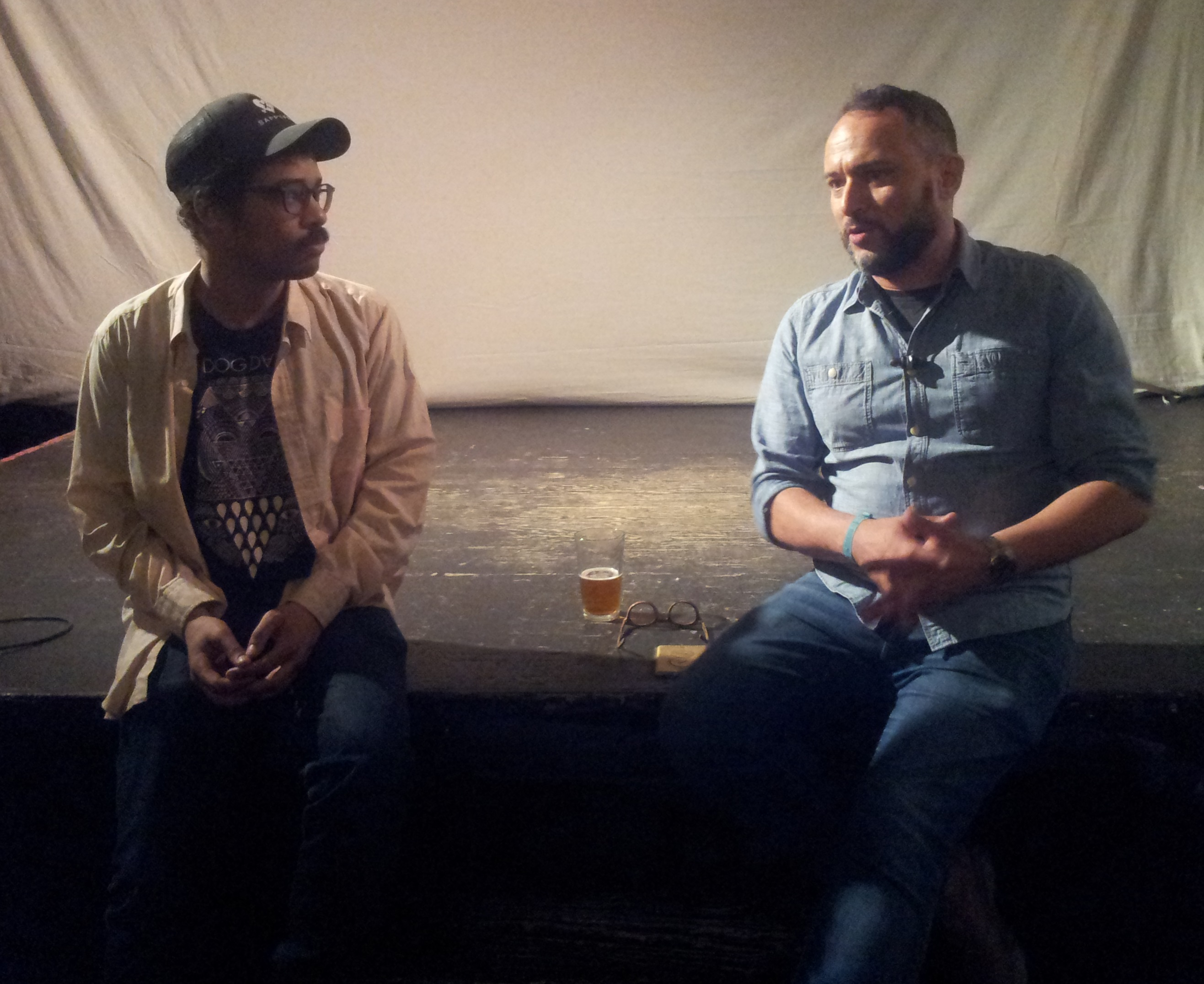

P.J. Marcellino (born Pedro José-Marcelino, 24 October 1978) is a Portuguese-Canadian filmmaker.

Born in Lisbon, Portugal, to a Portuguese a family with Portuguese, Cape-Verdean and Italian roots, he is a journalist, children's author, political analyst, and filmmaker.

== Journalist and author ==
Marcellino was an international editor and architecture critic at the Chinese magazine Landscape Design, writing in English, and publishing numerous pieces under the names Pedro F. Marcelino and 潘德磊 (Pin-Yin: Pan De Lei). He authored two best-selling books with the magazine’s publisher, Dalian University of Technology Press: The World's Landscape Design Top-50 (2007) and City + Design + Evolution: Unique Landscape Design from 6 Continents.

With co-writer Slawko Waschuk, he authored the Junior Jetsetters series of travel guides for children.

As a social scientist and political analyst, he has published extensively on migration, refugee, and inclusion issues, and worked as a consultant and policy advisor on issues of migration and peace and security with the United Nations, the International Organization for Migration, the African Union, and others.

== Filmmaker ==
Marcellino studied Documentary Filmmaking in Toronto at Seneca College's Documentary Film Institute.

His first film, After the War: Memoirs of Exile (2014), dealt with issues of memory, PTSD, and intergenerational trauma in a family of German-Ukrainian immigrants to Canada. The soundtrack was composed by Greek-Canadian composer Christos Hatzis and performed by the Juno Award-winning Gryphon Trio. The film was nominated for Best Feature and the Golden Pegasus Award at the 2015 Peloponnesian International Film Festival, and long-listed for a 2015 SAMHSA Voice Award.

Marcellino co-directed, wrote, and produced the music documentary When They Awake, which celebrated the renaissance and mainstreaming of Indigenous music and culture in Canada. The film showcased the work of Susan Aglukark, A Tribe Called Red, Tanya Tagaq, Wab Kinew, and many others. Following its world premiere at the Opening Night Gala of the 2017 Calgary International Film Festival, the film went on to gather positive reviews and awards across North America. It received the Best Documentary Feature award at the Hamilton Film Festival and Desert Rocks Film & Music Festival, as well as the Jury's 3rd Prize in the Documentaries of the World category at the Montreal World Film Festival. It was nominated for Best Documentary and Best Environmental Documentary at Red Nation Film Festival.

== Documentary films ==
- After the War: Memoirs of Exile (2004)
- When They Awake (2017)

== Books ==
- The World’s Landscape Design Top-50 (2007)
- Junior Jetsetters Guide to Amsterdam (2009) with Slawko Waschuk
- Junior Jetsetters Guide to Vancouver (2010) with Slawko Waschuk
- Junior Jetsetters Guide to Paris (2010) with Slawko Waschuk
- Junior Jetsetters Guide to Lisbon (2010) with Slawko Waschuk
- Junior Jetsetters Guide to Chicago (2010) with Slawko Waschuk
- City + Design + Evolution: Unique Landscape Design from 6 Continents(2011)
- The New Migration Paradigm of Transitional African Spaces: Inclusion, exclusion, liminality and economic competition in transit countries: a case study on the Cape Verde Islands (2011)

== List of awards ==
- Calgary International Film Festival: "When They Awake" (Opening Gala Selection), 2017
- Hamilton Film Festival: "When They Awake," (Best Documentary Feature), 2017
- Desert Rocks Film & Music Festival: "When They Awake," (Best Documentary Feature), 2017
- Montreal World film Festival: "When They Awake," (3rd Prize, Documentaries of the World), 2017
- Red Nation Film Festival: "When They Awake," (Nominee, Best Documentary), 2017
- Red Nation Film Festival: "When They Awake," (Nominee, Best Environmental Documentary), 2017
- Peloponnesian International Film Festival: "After the War: Memoirs of Exile," (Nominee, Best Feature), 2015
- Peloponnesian International Film Festival: "After the War: Memoirs of Exile," (Nominee, Golden Pegasus Award), 2015
