= Dalian University of Technology Press =

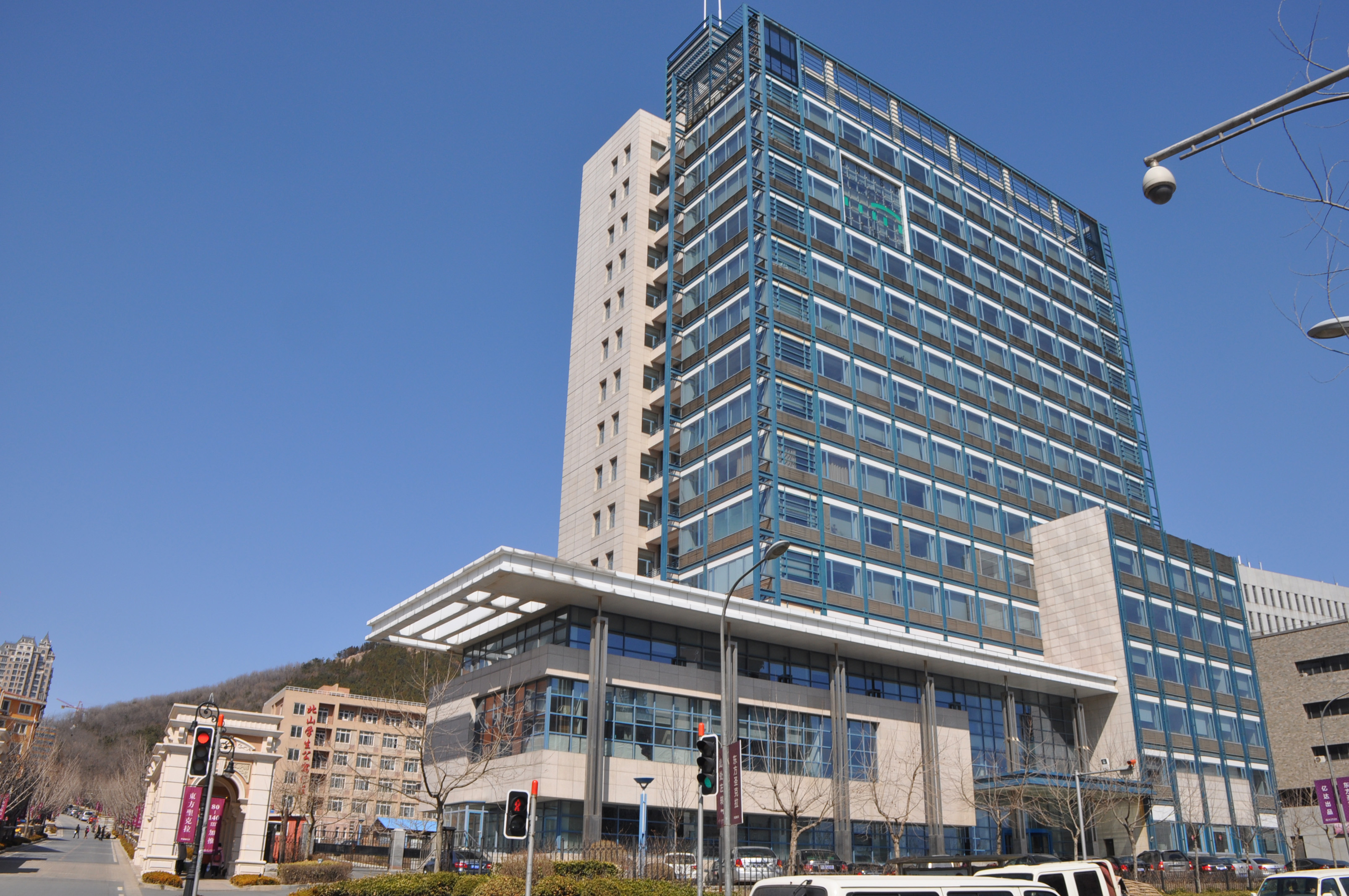
Dalian University of Technology Science Park B Building where DUTP is housed

Dalian University of Technology Press (Chinese: 大连理工大学出版社) or DUTP is a university press owned by Dalian University of Technology, in Dalian, Liaoning Province, China. It is the largest of the publishers in Dalian, including Dongbei University of Finance and Economics Press, Liaoning Normal University Press and Dalian Publishing Company. It was established in 1985; its president is Dr. Jin Yingwei.

== Published books ==
Reflecting te vibrant IT Outsourcing business from Japan in the nearby Dalian Software Park and Dalian Hi-tech Zone, it publishes technical books and others, such as:

- Japanese Language by Koji Oikawa (2010)

== See also ==
- Dalian University of Technology
