= Dalian Software Park =

Industrial zone in China

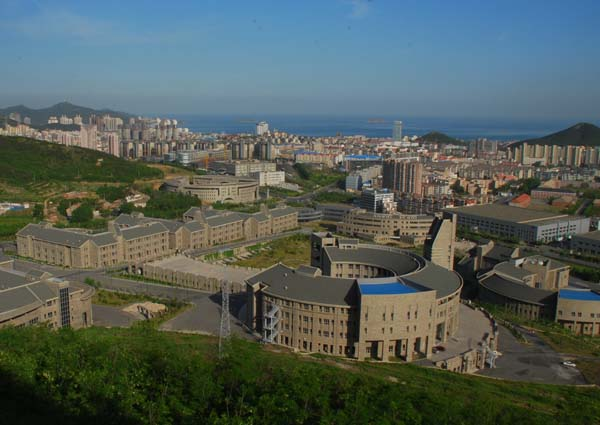
Dalian Software Park, with the Yellow Sea in the background

Dalian Software Park (simplified Chinese: 大连软件园; traditional Chinese: 大連軟件園; pinyin: Dàlián ruǎnjiàn yuán), also called DLSP, is an industrial zone, created in 1998 in the western suburbs of Dalian City, Liaoning Province, China, where many of the world's large and medium-sized IT-related companies have set up shop to do software development and information services. It is part of Dalian Hi-tech Zone in the broader sense. While American and European companies typically have gone to Bangalore and other cities in India because of the English language capability, Japanese companies have gone to Dalian and other cities in China due to the Japanese language capability.

DLSP is owned by Dalian Software Park Co., Ltd., which was invested and established by Yida Group and is a professional service provider in business park development, management and operation. By the end of 2009, there were over 500 enterprises in the Dalian Software Park, 41 percent of which are foreign-funded. There are 37 Fortune 500 companies including IBM, HP, Accenture, Panasonic, Sony, Hitachi, NTT, Oracle, AVAYA, NEC, Fidelity, BT etc. In 2009, Dalian Software Park realized an annual sales income of RMB 20.2 billion, with an export value of US$0.86 billion.

Dalian is one of China's 11 "National Software Industry Bases" and one of five "National Software Export Bases." Currently, more than 300 companies, including 32 Global 500 corporations, have offices in the park.

The nearest airport, Dalian Zhoushuizi International Airport, is 10–20 km away from Dalian Software Park. Its nearest national highway is G202.

== Flow of overseas IT outsourcing ==
Beginning in the 1980s, many IT companies in the developed world began to take interest in offshore labour markets. IT related work in the developed countries had been suffering from lack of IT workers and increased cost. The worldwide trend is now moving from domestic outsourcing to overseas outsourcing into countries that have a comparative advantage in labour-intensive business activities. The IT work is not only software development which require engineering skills (ITO), but also other business work which requires soft skills rather than engineering skills. (BPO), such as call center and other information services is a major aspect of DLSP's tenant's offshore business.

== Launch of Dalian's software industry ==
Having been the major industrial base of Manchukuo during Japanese colonization, Dalian has a history of foreign investment. Since the early 1980s, Dalian has been a major recipient of Japanese and Korean foreign investment. Software development in Dalian began in the early 1980s.

To attract economic activity, the municipal government established Dalian Development Area in the northern suburbs and Dalian Hi-tech Zone in the western suburbs for the high-tech industries. During the first half of the 1990s, application software outsourcing from overseas, particularly from Japan, has increased. Dalian Hi-Think Computer Technology Corp. (DHC), which had derived from Dalian City Computer Center, and Dalian Hisoft Corp. were established in the high-tech zone. They were involved in application software development, outsourced from NTT Data, NEC, Hitachi Software Engineering, etc.

Since the 1990s Dalian City has emphasized the development of the IT industry, especially in Dalian Hi-tech Zone and Dalian Software Park in the western suburbs near Dalian University of Technology. There are Chinese IT companies (such as DHC, hiSoft and Neusoft Group) and American, European, Indian and Japanese IT companies, such as Accenture, Dell, Genpact, HP, IBM, Liferay, SAP AG, Oracle Corporation, Siemens, Alpine, CSK Holding, Panasonic, NEC, Sony, Cisco, Netapp, British Telecom, Aspect, and Fidelity.

Currently, the "Lushun South Road Software Industry Belt" Plan is proceeding, including Dalian Software Park Phase 2.

Dalian has recently become an important center for information technology offshoring and business process outsourcing, similar to Bangalore in India; the city was described in The World Is Flat by Thomas Friedman (2007). In another way, Dalian is the forerunner of China's "Re-Development of the Old Industry Bases in Northeast" National Project, which began in 2002.

Today, Dalian is the most established information technology outsourcing (ITO) and business processing outsourcing (BPO) city in the PRC and among the top ITO and BPO destinations in the world.

== Birth of Dalian Software Park ==
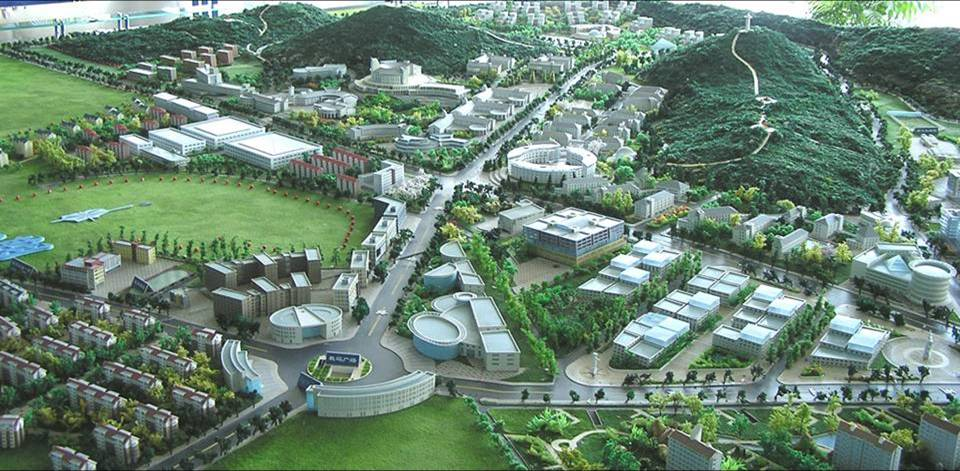
Dalian Software Park model

Dalian Software Park (DLSP) was established in 1998, in the 3 km^{2} area, in the western suburb of Dalian, near Dalian Hi-tech Zone. It is surrounded by the hills on the three sides and by the Yellow Sea on the remaining side, and is an academic area where Dalian University of Technology and Dongbei University of Finance and Economics are located.

Management of the Park is done by Dalian Software Park Co., Ltd., a private enterprise 100 percent owned by one of the three largest real estate developers in Dalian (Yida Group), which is rare in China where all other software parks are managed either directly by local governments or indirectly by government agencies. The company provides professional services, from registration and basic property management to human resource services to assist in the operations of the IT companies. See also "Preferential policies" below.

Today, Dalian Software Park is the leading business park management and development company in the PRC. In addition to the park in Dalian, DLSP has developed parks in Wuhan, Suzhou, and Tianjin.

== History ==
Established in 1999, Dalian Software Park is a key part of the development of Dalian, a hub of the international IT industry in China. With an area covering 7.16 square kilometers, Dalian Software Park is one of the ten State-level software industry bases. Its export volume is increasing by 100 percent annually. Over 300 enterprises, including more than 60 foreign companies, have settled their IT business in the park.

As it opened officially, Neusoft Group came to this park to establish their development centers, and later established Dalian Neusoft University of Information. Matsushita Electric Industrial (Panasonic) was the first to enter the park, followed by Alpine, Sony and others.

American and European companies, such as GE (Genpact), HP, IBM and SAP, came to establish ITO and/or BPO centers, mainly to do their Japanese subsidiaries' work. Chinasoft (headquartered in Beijing) and Xinhua were among the first Chinese-owned IT companies. Later, such Chinese-owned IT companies such as iSoftStone (Beijing), New Touch (Shanghai) and Nantian (Shenzhen) also came here.

See also "Dalian Software Park Phase 2" below.

== Current status ==
Currently, there are more than 380 companies in Dalian Software Park (a September 2006 survey by Dalian Software Park):

- 58% Domestic Chinese companies
- 42% Overseas companies
  - 27% Japanese companies
  - 15% Other Overseas companies (American, European, Korean, Taiwan. Korean, etc.)

=== Workforce ===
The IT service work done in Dalian Software Park can be categorized as follows (A 2006 survey by Dalian Software Park):

- 40% Application software development
- 30% Business process outsourcing
- 10% Embedded software development
- 20% Other, such as Drawing, IC or Printed Circuit Board (PCB) Design, R&D and Animation/Video Games

Application development is done mostly by the engineering school graduates of the universities, while embedded software development requires more technical skills in the areas, such as telecommunications or special hardware.

Those workers involved in BPO varies from the middle school graduates for data entry, to the foreign language school graduates for simpler BPO work, and the returnees of overseas studies for inbound or outbound call center/contact center work. To emphasize the importance of information privacy, Dalian City Software Industry Association has recently implemented, in cooperation with Japan Information Processing Development Corporation (JIPDEC), a citywide PIPA (Privacy Information Protection Assessment) program.

=== Dalian Geography ===
Dalian City is located in the southern tip of China's northeast region. It is surrounded on the three sides by the Yellow and Bohai Seas, and is known for a relatively mild climate in this region with otherwise severe winter.

Dalian has a metropolitan population of about 6 million. It is the most developed city in the northeast region.

=== IT Capability and Linguistic Ability ===
Most of the IT workers come from the engineering schools of the universities in Dalian and other cities in Northeast China. In Dalian, there are Dalian University of Technology, Dalian Jiaotong University, Dalian Maritime University, and Dalian Neusoft University of Information which is within the Park. In other cities, there are Northeast University in Shenyang, Jilin University in Changchun, and Harbin Industrial University in Harbin.

Workers with English ability come from the various universities where English is predominantly their first foreign language, but they lack the experience of the Indian university graduates with working knowledge of English. There are also the English-speaking returnees of study abroad, typically from U.S., Canada, Australia, New Zealand and Great Britain. French speaking workers are from Dalian University of Foreign Languages (DLUFL, 100 graduates each year), Liaoning Normal University (LNNU, 30 graduates each year) or the returnees of study abroad, typically in France and Quebec, Canada. L'Alliance française, France's worldwide network of French language education, is located at DLUFL.

Dalian is particularly unique in the fact that there are many workers with Japanese language ability for the following historical reasons:

- The southern half of the present-day Dalian City was a Japanese occupied territory, 1905–1945
- Dalian University of Foreign Language was established in 1963 as the center of Japanese studies in China.
- Since the late 1980s, many Japanese companies have established manufacturing subsidiaries and have been employing Japanese speaking Chinese.

Another factor contributing to the Japanese language capability in Dalian is the presence of about two million ethnic Koreans, most of whom live in the Northeast. Culturally and linguistically, China's ethnic Koreans are nearly identical to the people in South Korea. Subsequently, they are capable of learning and speaking Japanese with ease.

=== Preferential Policies ===
The Dalian municipal government offers generous tax exemptions and subsidies such as corporate income tax exemption during the first two years of business establishment and 50 percent tax reduction in the following three years. After this five-year period, the Dalian municipal government will offer a reduced tax rate of 15% rather than the usual 25% for high-tech companies.

The preferential policy of Dalian City can be summarized in the following points:

- The university graduates who have sought high-tech jobs are given the Dalian City residency rights.
- Since 2004, the software development companies in Dalian Software Park or Dalian High-Tech Park are allowed to pay reduced amount of contribution to the retirement funds (allowance).
- The employees of such companies in such locations are given income tax incentives.

== Transportation ==
See here for details. About 20 minutes by taxi from the Airport, the major hotels on Renmin Road, or Dalian railway station.

== Education ==
See here for details.

== Accommodation ==
See here for details.

== Local environment ==
See here for details.

== Dalian Software Park Phase 2 ==
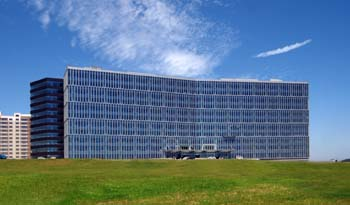
Dalian Ascendas IT Park

The construction of Dalian Software Park Phase 2 was begun in 2003 as part of the City Government's "Dalian Software Industry Belt Along Lushun South Road" Project, in a 12 km^{2} area, immediately west of Dalian Hi-tech Zone.

- A joint venture between Ascendas of Singapore and DLSP completed a large office building for occupancy in September 2007 (Dalian Ascendas IT Park).
- Neusoft Group is completing its second Neusoft Park office complex in 2008.
- A joint venture between DLSP and Shui On Group of Hong Kong will open Dalian Tiandi Software Park and related commercial area in 2009. In September 2007, it was announced at the ceremonies commemorating the start of the construction that Dalian-based Yida Group and Hong Kong-based Shui On Group are to invest a total of 15 billion yuan (US$2 billion) and that the annual revenues of 10 billion yuan (US$1.33 billion) will be generated at the park after the completion of the second phase.

== Future ==
=== Service outsourcing base along Lüshun North Road ===
It was announced in June 2007, that a Dalian International Service Outsourcing Base will be created at Dadonggou, on Lüshun North Road, about ten kilometers west of Dalian International Airport.

=== Expanding to other cities in China ===
Based on its experience of success so far, Dalian Software Park has decided to build other software parks, in cooperation with the local hi-tech committees:

- Wuhan, Hubei: Wuhan "Optical Valley" Software Park is ready for occupancy since April 2007. Wuhan is in the center of China's population distribution of 13 million.
- Suzhou, Jiangsu: Suzhou Software Technology Park in Suzhou Hi-Tech Park SND, located in the western suburbs of Suzhou City, on Lake Tai, nearer to Wuxi International Airport, will be ready for occupancy from December 2007.
- Tianjin: Tianjin Binghai Service Outsourcing Base, to be built on the Bohai Sea side of Tianjin Economic & Development Area (TEDA), will be ready for occupancy from December 2008.

DLSP is also aggressively seeking to expand into other regions in China.

== IT-related companies and organizations in Dalian ==
=== In Dalian Hi-Tech Zone ===
- Managed by Dalian Hgh-Tech Zone Management Committee
- American companies: BearingPoint, Citibank, Dell, Avaya Communications etc.
- Chinese companies: DHC, hiSoft, etc.
- Japanese companies: HAL Film Maker, Jtekt, MI Communication, etc.

=== In Dalian Software Park ===
- Built and managed by Dalian Software Co., Ltd.
- American companies: Accenture, Fidelity Investments, Genpact (a GE company), HP, IBM, Oracle Corporation, Cisco, Symantec, Netapp, etc.
- Chinese companies: China Software & Service (CS&S), Neusoft Group, Neusoft Institute of Information, New Touch, etc.
- European companies: British Telecom (UK), SAP (Germany), Oostsourcing (A joint venture of Akyla 40%, Better Be 40%, Insight 20%, Netherlands)
- Japanese companies Alpine, Fujitsu Device, Hitachi, NEC, Panasonic, OMRON, Sony, Sumitomo Wiring Systems, Yokogawa Electric, etc.
- Other companies: Satyam (India), Wistron (Taiwan), etc.

=== In Dalian Software Park Phase 2 ===
==== In Dalian Ascendas IT Park ====
- Built and managed by Dalian Ascendas Co., Ltd., a DLSP-Ascendas joint venture
- Konica Minolta, DHC, Lüshun South Road Software Industry Belt Demonstration Room, etc.

==== In Dalian Tiandi Software Park ====
- Built and managed by a DLSP-Shui On Group joint venture
- To open in 2008

=== In Other parts of Dalian ===
- There are IT companies and organizations that are located in other areas of the city.
- Dalian InfoMedia, With System, Sumisei Computer System, NHN Corporation (Korea), Dalian City Bureau of Information Industry, Dalian City Software Industry Association, etc.

== History of the IT industry in Dalian ==
- 1992: Dalian Computer Center (DCC) of the Dalian City Government received an order from NTT Data to do application software development.
- 1996: DCC split one of its departments to found Dalian Hi-Think Computer Technology Corp. (DHC, Nov.) Dalian Hisoft Corp. was founded (Nov.).
- 1998: Groundbreaking of Dalian Software Park (June).
- 1999: Official opening of Dalian Software Park (July). Neusoft Group opened a Dalian development center (July). Singapore's BHR-Frontline opened a Dalian development center, as the first foreign company in this Park.
- 2000: Northeast University's Neusoft Institute of Information (Now known as Dalian Neusoft University of Information) started. (Sept.).
- 2001: Japan Information Service Industry Association (JISA) and China Information Industry Association had their 5th joint meeting in Dalian (July). Panasonic opened its development center, as the first Japanese company in the Park (Sept.).
- 2002: DHC became No. 1 in China's Software Export Ranking.
- 2003: Dalian City announced the "Lüshun South Road Software Industry Belt" plan and the groundbreaking ceremonies of Dalian Software Park Phase 2 were held (June). The First China (Dalian) International Software & Information Service Fair was held (July). IBM, Accenture, CSK and others entered the Park.
- 2004: HP, SAP, OMRON and other companies entered the Park.
- 2005: The First China-Japan Embedded Software Seminar was held and a T-Engine demonstration room was established (June).
- 2006: Chinese Ministry of Commerce gave Dalian City an "International Business Outsourcing Base" recognition.
- 2007: Opening of Dalian Ascendas IT Park (Sept.). Groundbreaking of Dalian Tiandi Software Park (Sept.).
- 2008: The 10th anniversary of Dalian Software Park (June). The world-famous companies, such as Nippon Steel, Cisco Systems, Sompo Japan, BT Group and Fidelity Investments, entered the Park. The Dalian (Japan) Software Park office was set up in Shinjuku Sumitomo Building, Tokyo.

=== References ===
- The History of DLSP (in Chinese)
- The Milestones of DHC (in Chinese)
- The History of Hisoft

== Other cities in China ==
There are 30-50 City-level, Province-level and National-level software parks in China. There are eleven National level software parks, in: Beijing, Chengdu, Dalian, Guangzhou, Hangzhou, Shanghai, Xi'an, and others.

A brief look at these cities are:

- Shanghai: Being the commercial center of China, the world's key IT industries have opened marketing and systems engineering centers, in its downtown or in such areas as Zhangjiang Hi-Tech Park in Pudong.
- Beijing: China's IT industry was "born" in Zhongguancun, near Peking University and Tsinghua University. The world's many IT companies have set up development centers, particularly research centers, due to availability of excellent universities in Beijing. In the north of Zhongguancun is also Zhongguancun Software Park.
- Chengdu and Xi'an: These inland cities are where key universities moved during the Sino-Japanese War. China's space exploration bases are nearby, and there are strong electronic industries. Chendu Tianfu (Heavenly City) Software Park has IBM, while Xi'an Software Park has Fujitsu, NEC and a joint venture of UFIDA Software (Yongyou) and NTT Data.

== See also ==
- Dalian Hi-Tech Zone
- Silicon Valley, US
- Silicon Fen, UK
- Silicon Wadi, Israel
- Yokosuka Research Park (YRP) and Kansai Science City, Japan
- List of technology centers of the World
- Software industry in China
- China Software Industry Association
