= Dalian Hi-Think Computer =

Dalian Hi-Think Computer Technology Corporation (Chinese: 大连华信计算机科技股份有限公司), often called DHC, is a provider of software development, industrial solutions and IT services headquartered in Dalian, Liaoning Province, China. It was established in 1996 as an spin-out of Dalian Information Center and its capital amounts to 150,000,000 CNY. NEC, NTT Data, Hitachi Software Engineering, NEC Soft, NS Solutions, and Microsoft have invested in DHC.

Currently, employing around 6,000 people, DHC is one of the largest information technology outsourcing (ITO) and business process outsourcing (BPO) companies in Dalian (DHC, Hisoft, IBM, HP, Genpact and Accenture), the "Bangalore" of China or the "IT and Business Process Outsourcing Capital of China".

In March 2014, DHC moved its headquarters to DHC Software Park. In July 2015, DHC's stock was listed on Chinese OTC market as NEEQ: 832715.

== See also ==
- Outsourcing
- Neusoft Group
- HiSoft Technology International
- Dalian Software Park
