= Dalian Ocean University =

University in Dalian, Liaoning, China

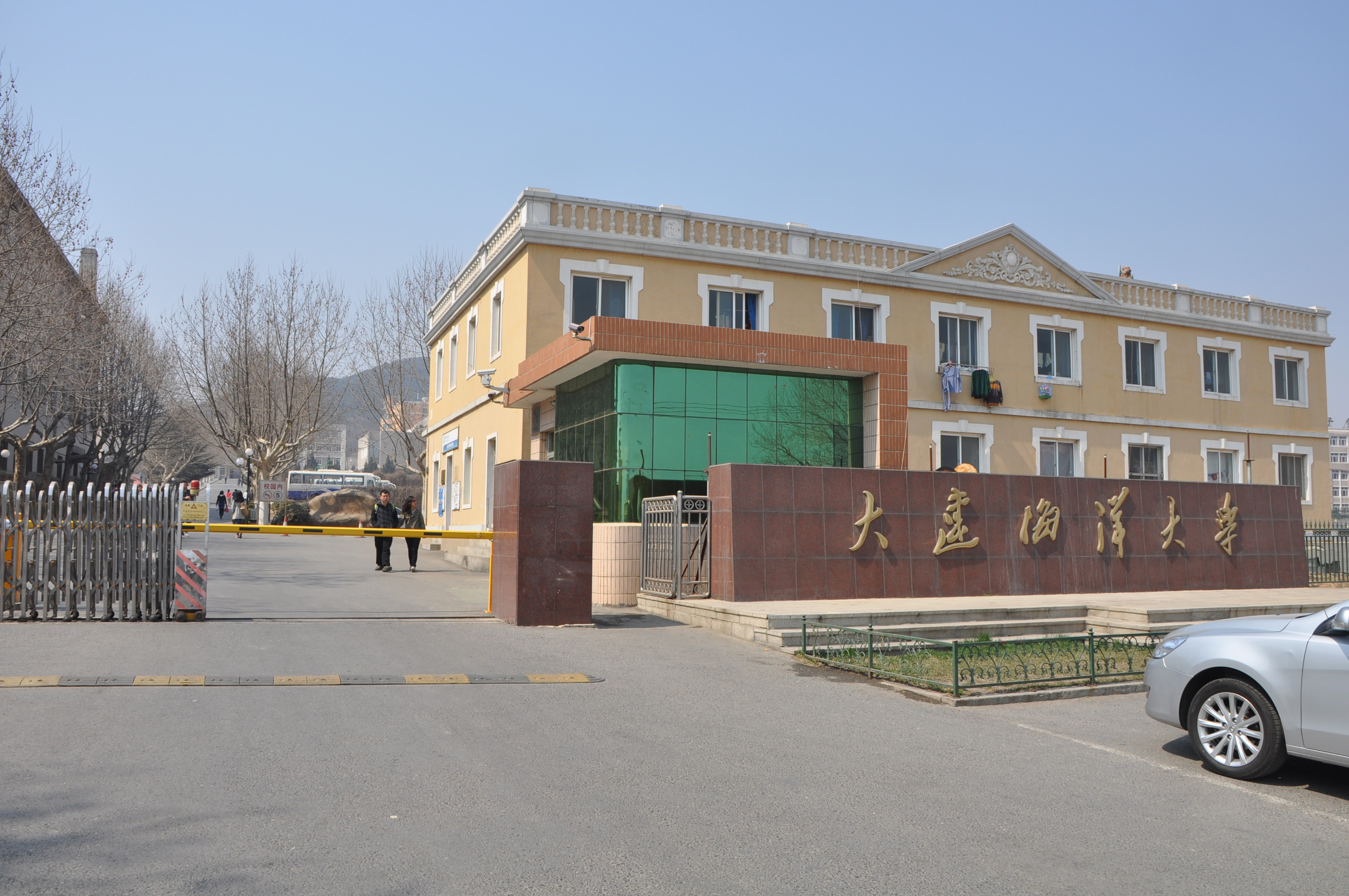
Entrance to Dalian Ocean University

Dalian Ocean University (Chinese: 大连海洋大学, Dalian Fisheries University before 2010) is a university in Dalian, China. Founded in 1952, it is the sole university featuring fisheries science courses in northern China. Over 7,000 students are enrolled.
