= NEC Solution Innovators =

NEC Solution Innovators, Ltd.
- Type: Subsidiary
- Industry: Electronics, network equipment provider
- Founded: 1975; 51 years ago
- Headquarters: Tokyo, Japan
- Key people: Norihiko Kunishima, President
- Products: IT Solutions, Network Solutions
- Number of employees: 5,341 (Consolidated)
- Website: www.nec-solutioninnovators.co.jp

NEC Solution Innovators, Ltd. (NECソリューションイノベータ株式会社, Enu-Ī-Shī Soryūshon Inobēta Kabushiki-gaisha), formerly NEC Soft, Ltd. (NECソフト株式会社, Enu-Ī-Shī Sofuto Kabushiki-gaisha), is a subsidiary of NEC Corp. It is headquartered in Kōtō, Tokyo, Japan, and specialized in information and communication technology systems building and maintenance.

NEC Solution Innovators provides its services to government agencies (municipalities), private companies, and other companies of NEC Group.

The company was founded in 1975 as a specialized IT service provider for the NEC group. It has grown into a parent company of its own, owning a few branches inside Japan and three overseas child companies: NEC Soft Beijing, NEC Soft Jinan, and NEC Solutions Vietnam.

The company was listed on Tokyo Stock Exchange and trading its own stocks until 2005, when re-organization by NEC group made it wholly owned by its parent company.
