= Shuishiying =

Camp sites or office buildings of Qing dynasty Naval Forces

Coordinates: 38.8526°N 121.2451°E

Shuishiying (Chinese: 水师营; pinyin: shuǐ shī yíng) were the camp sites or office buildings of the Naval Forces (Chinese: 水师) during the later days of the Qing dynasty of China.

The most famous Shuishiying was in Lüshunkou District, Dalian, Liaoning, where the ceasefire treaty of the Battle of Lüshun was signed between Anatoly Stessel and Maresuke Nogi, representing Russia and Japan respectively, in 1905, during the Russo-Japanese War.

== See also ==
- Dalian
- Lüshunkou District
- Russo-Japanese War
