= Dalian University of Foreign Languages =

Provincial public university in Dalian, Liaoning, China

- 大连外国语大学
- Former names: Dalian Foreign Language Institute (大连外国语学院, 1978–2013)
- Motto: 崇德尚文，兼收并蓄
- Type: Public
- Established: 1964
- Academic staff: 900
- Students: 20,000+
- Undergraduates: 10,000
- Postgraduates: 7,000
- Location: Dalian, Liaoning, China
- Campus: Urban
- Website: dlufl.edu.cn

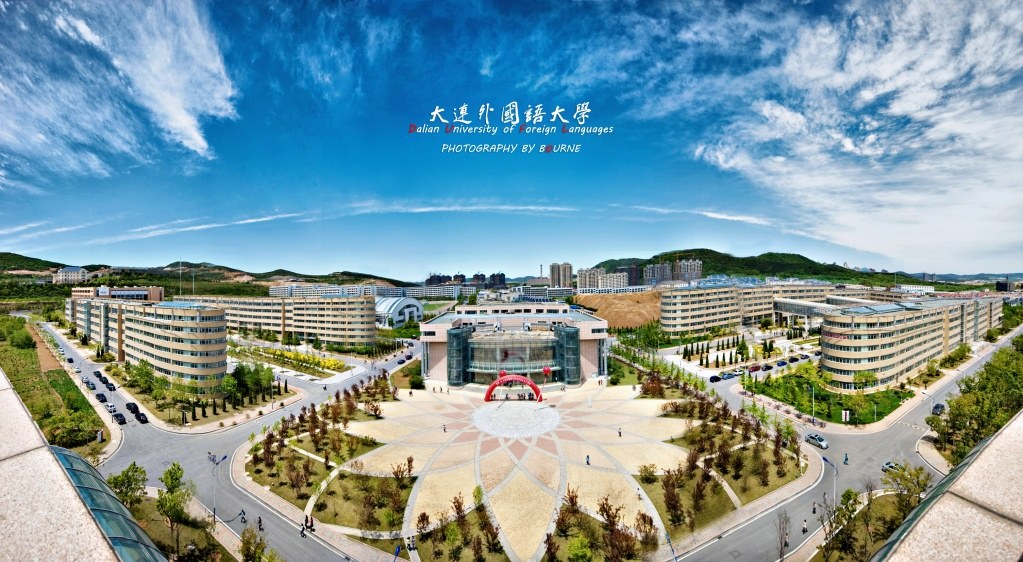
Panorama of Dalian University of Foreign Languages

The Dalian University of Foreign Languages (DLUFL; 大连外国语大学) is a provincial public university in Dalian, Liaoning, China. It is affiliated with the Liaoning Provincial People's Government.

Formerly known as Dalian School of Japanese Language, DLUFL was founded in 1964 with the help of the late Chinese Premier Zhou Enlai. It is now under the administration of the Education Commission of Liaoning Province. Through 40 years of development, DLUFL has fledged into a multi-disciplinary foreign language university which also offers programs in other fields like arts, economics, management, engineering and law.

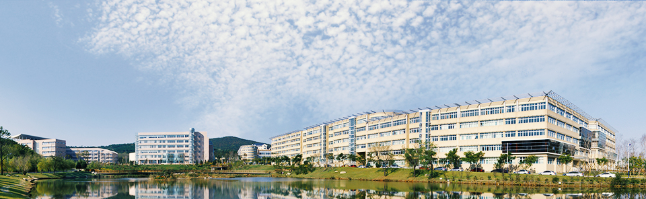
Mingyang Lake

Dalian University of Foreign Languages

Chinese name
- Traditional Chinese: 大連外國語大學
- Simplified Chinese: 大连外国语大学
Transcriptions
Standard Mandarin
- Hanyu Pinyin: Dàlián Wàiguóyǔ Dàxué

Abbreviated as
- Chinese: 大外
Transcriptions
Standard Mandarin
- Hanyu Pinyin: Dàwài

Korean name
- Hangul: 대련외국어대학
Transcriptions
- Revised Romanization: Daeryeon Oegugeo Daehak

Japanese name
- Kanji: 大連外国語大学
- Kana: だいれんがいこくごだいがく
Transcriptions
- Romanization: Dairen Gaikokugo Daigaku

Russian name
- Russian: Даляньский университет иностранных языков

== Campus ==
In 2007, the university moved its main campus to Lüshunkou, formerly known as Lüshun Port, which, due to its enviable military harbor, was once the major theater for the Russo-Japanese War during 1904–1905. Lüshunkou or Lüshun／Lvshun, along with its twin sister city Dalian, was also part of the former colony of the Empire of Japan, with Lvshun hosting the headquarters of the Japanese Kwantung Army.

The university's old campus in downtown Dalian remained until 2013, when the School of Chinese Studies was also moved to Lüshunkou District. The Lüshun Campus boasts scenic views, spanning over 1,260,000 square meters (310 acres), with a building area of 500,000 square meters (120 acres).

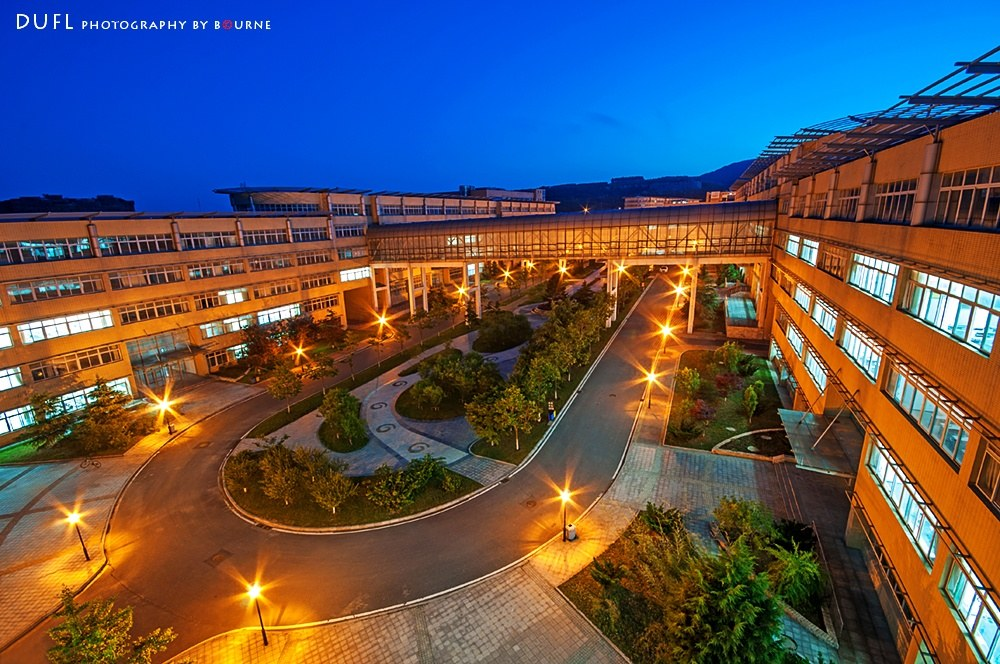
Dalian University of Foreign Languages Main Campus

=== Facility ===
The library of the university holds 765,000 copies of books and 600,000 electronic books with the electronic reading rooms.

=== Location ===
- Lüshunkou District, Dalian, No.6 Lüshun South Road (大连市旅顺口区旅顺南路)

== History ==
With the help of the late Chinese Premier Zhou Enlai, DLUFL was founded in 1964 to teach Japanese language, and in the 1970s, the English school and the Russian school were established. Other language departments were then established to meet the needs of the reform and opening up that began in 1978. In the mid-1980s, the university was authorized by Ministry of Education of the People's Republic of China to offer postgraduate programs.

== Administration ==
=== Faculty ===
Among the 1,000 faculty and staff, 300 hold Professor or Associate Professor titles. Ten prominent professors receive the Special Allowances from the State Council.

=== Programmes ===
DLUFL offers 20 bachelor programs, among which 10 lead to master programs. The 20 bachelor programs include Japanese, English, Russian, French, Korean, German, Spanish, Arabic, Portuguese, Italian, Chinese, Chinese Literature, Teaching Chinese as a Second language, Art Design, Tourism Management, International Economics & Trade, Computer Science & Technology, Information Management and Information Systems, Computer Software Engineering, Journalism and Music Studies are named key disciplines at the provincial level.

== Language Training and Testing Centers ==
DLUFL administers over 20 language tests such as TOEFL, GRE, HSK, JLPT, BJT, KLPT, and WSK.

== Notable alumni ==
- Liu Xiaoming, former Chinese Ambassador to the United Kingdom.
- Chen Naiqing, former Chinese Ambassador to Norway; wife of former Chinese ambassador to the United States Zhang Yesui.
- Yu Shayan, Deputy Governor of Heilongjiang Province, China.
