= Dalian Maritime University =

Public university in Dalian, Liaoning, China

Coordinates: 38°52′14″N 121°31′33″E

- 大连海事大学
- Former name: Dalian Marine College
- Motto: 学汇百川，德济四海
- Type: Public University
- Established: 1909; 117 years ago
- President: Shan Hongjun
- Faculty: 1662
- Location: Dalian, Liaoning, China
- Campus: Urban
- Colors: DMU blue (dark); DMU blue (light)
- Website: www.dlmu.edu.cn

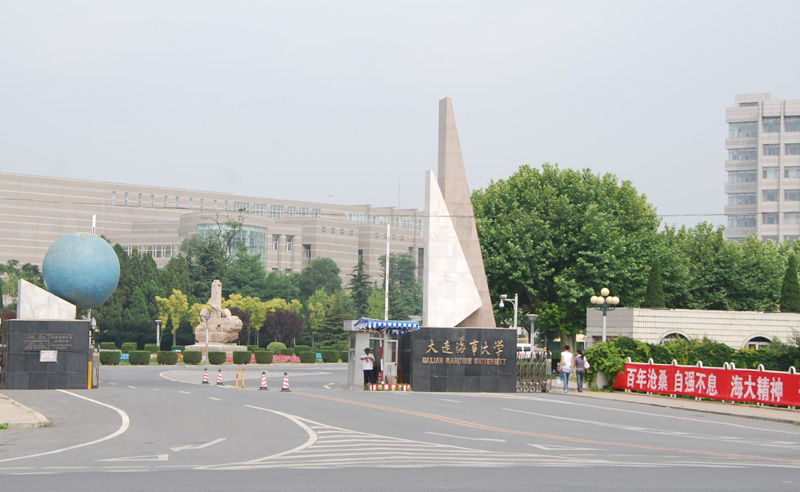
The Old Gate of Dalian Maritime University.

Dalian Maritime University (DLMU; 大连海事大学) is a public university in Dalian, Liaoning, China. It is affiliated with the Ministry of Transport. The university is part of Project 211 and the Double First-Class Construction.

== History ==
The history of the university can be traced back to 1909, when the Nanyang Institute in Shanghai established a Shipping Management Section. DMU was founded in 1953 through the merger of three merchant marine institutions: Shanghai Nautical College, the Northeast Navigation College and Fujian Navigation School. At the time its name was Dalian Marine College, and it was the only maritime college in China. In 1960, DMU was designated a national key institution of higher education. Later, in 1983, the Asia-Pacific Region Maritime Training Center was established at DMU by the United Nations Development Program (UNDP) and the IMO, and in 1985, a branch of the World Maritime University (WMU) was established.

In 1994 the university's name was changed to the present one.

On June 6, 2009, DMU celebrated its centennial, with vice chairman of standing committee of 11th National People's Congress Chen Zhili as the main guest.

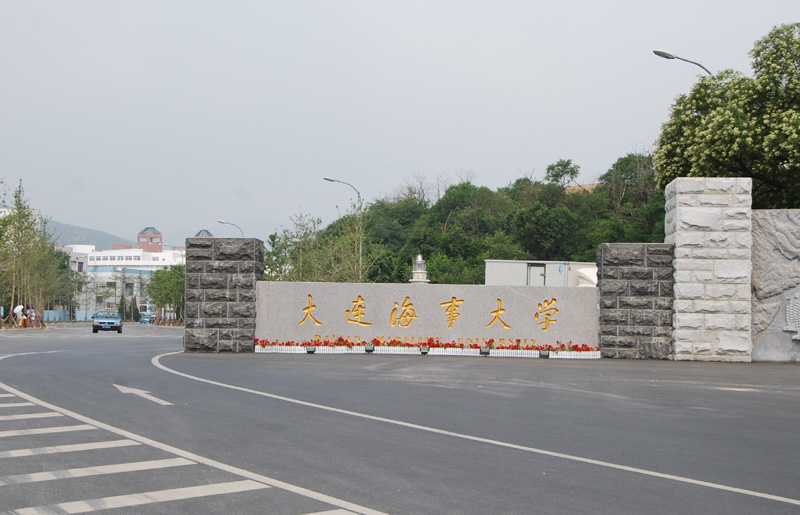
The New Gate of Dalian Maritime University, completed in 2009 for its centennial celebration.

== Academics ==
The university is designated as one of the "Project 211" institutions. Only about six percent of the universities across China were selected in this project. The university consists of 14 colleges and departments.

Currently DMU has 42 undergraduate programs, 2 first-class doctoral programs, 12 second-class doctoral programs, 7 first-class master's degree programs and 59 second-class master's degree programs. Transport Engineering first-class discipline has a post-doctoral R&D base. The university is authorized to confer MBA, MPA, J.M., and Master of Engineering, an on-the-job master's degree.

== International collaboration ==
The university is an active member of the University of the Arctic. UArctic is an international cooperative network based in the Circumpolar Arctic region, consisting of more than 200 universities, colleges, and other organizations with an interest in promoting education and research in the Arctic region.

== Notable alumni ==
- Chen Zhenggao
- Qian Yongchang
- Jin Yan

== See also ==
- Chinese shipping
- Shanghai Maritime University
