= China Software Industry Association =

The China Software Industry Association (CSIA) is the major representative and one of the most active associations in the China software industry. Its goal is to promote the development of software industry in China and provide a hub with overseas markets.

The organization has also been empowered by the nation's state country under the "No.18 Document" as part of the 46 local software industry associations to become a key tool to the country's information industry.

In its operations, the organization is nationally accredited by creating forums, intellectual property rights protection, and other activities related to setting industry regulation drivers within the country. The organization's members include major multinational corporations such as Microsoft as it enables them to meet fellow software industry organizations, innovators, and enhance the industry.

== Domestic software industry ==
- China's software industry grew at a CAGR of more than 39% over the period from 2001 to 2007 and is further anticipated to grow at a CAGR of nearly 22% through 2012.
- Rapid growth in IT spending among various industrial segments, including government, banking and manufacturing are likely to propel the domestic software industry in near future.
- The ongoing large-scale endeavors for 3G deployments are expected to fuel growth in the demand for 3G telecom software across various application platforms.
- Expanding broadband infrastructure with increased Internet penetration among Small and Medium Businesses (SMBs) will help the SaaS market to grow at a CAGR of approx 44% during 2008–2012.
- The software outsourcing market is anticipated to grow at a CAGR of nearly 34% from 2008 to 2012.
- The current perception of lack of required talent in coming few years is urging the foreign IT training and education centers to expand into China's IT education market.

== Key companies ==
- UFIDA Software Co. Ltd
- Kingdee International Software Group Co. Ltd
- Integrated Solutions Limited (ISL)
- Neusoft
- hiSoft Technology International Ltd.
- Beyondsoft
- VanceInfo Technologies Inc.
- Chinasoft International Ltd.

== Software parks ==
China's Top Ten Software Technology Parks, according to CCID Consulting as of February 2008 (in order):

- Shanghai Zhangjiang High Technology Park
- Beijing Software Industry Base
- Shenzhen Software Park
- Dalian Software Park
- Xi'an Software Park
- Chengdu Tianfu Software Park
- Guangzhou Tianhe Software Park
- Jinan Qilu Software Park
- Hangzhou High Technology Software Park
- Nanjing (Jiansu) Software Park

== See also ==
- Institute of Software, Chinese Academy of Sciences
- Ministry of Industry and Information Technology
- List of Linux distributions (Linpus Linux, Asianux, Red Flag Linux)
- P2PTV (TVUPlayer, PPLive, QQLive, PPStream)
- Sunwah - PearL Linux
- Sunwah Linux (rays Linux Distribution)
- Electronic information industry in China
- CSDN
- Seioglobal
- Category:Chinese-language Linux distributions Co-CreateLinux, Hiweed, Red Flag Linux
- Dalian Software Park
- Neusoft Group
- Neusoft Institute of Information
- Kingsoft
- PPStream
- Vagaa
- Co-CreateLinux
- ETEN operation system
- Red Flag Linux
- Paul Kan Man-Lok
- Liu Zhiming
- CJK characters
- Wenlin Software for learning Chinese
- Xunlei
- Linux Unified Kernel
- Mozilla China
- Mozilla Online
- Xuedong Huang
- Feitian Technologies Co., Ltd.
- Ticketing and Reservation System
- Online gaming in China
- Video gaming in China
- Shenzhen Electronics Industries Association

These are the associations in Asia for the IT and service industries:

- Japan Information Industry Association (JISA)
- NASSCOM (National Association of Software and Services Companies), India
- Philippine Software Industry Association
- Vietnam Software Association (VINASA)
