= Electronics industry in Japan =

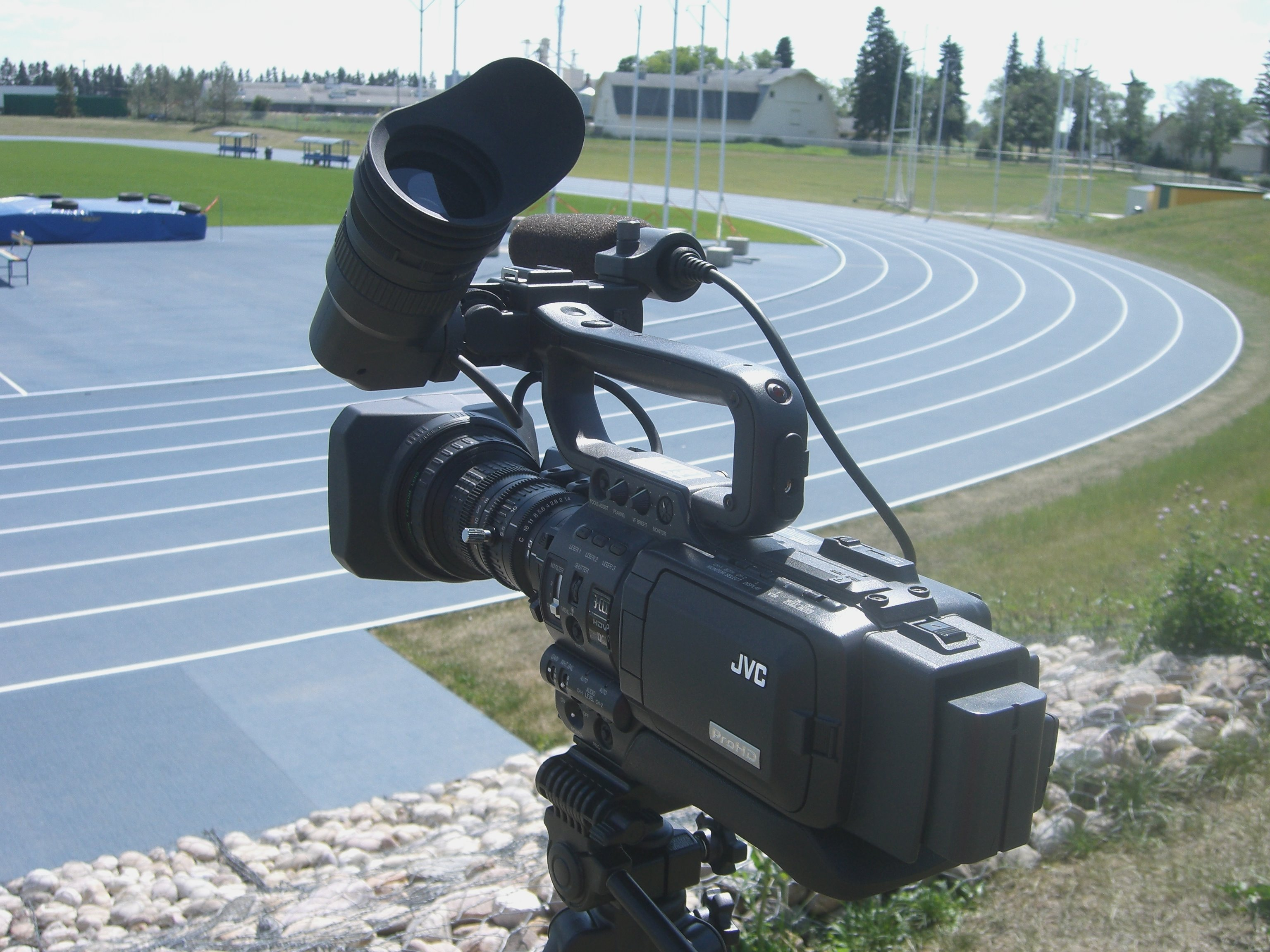
Professional video camera from JVC

In Japan, the electronics industry is one of the largest in the world, though the share of Japanese electronics companies has significantly declined from its peak due to competition from South Korea, Taiwan, China, and the United States.

Japanese companies have been responsible for a number of important innovations, including having pioneered the transistor radio and the Walkman (Sony), the first mass-produced laptops (Toshiba), the VHS recorder (JVC), and solar cells and LCD screens (Sharp).

== History ==
Japan's foreign direct investment in the consumer electronics industry was motivated by protectionism and labor costs, encouraging foreign capital to invest in a country with lower production overhead and prewar industrial know-how to be competitive in the electronics market. After three years of voluntary export restraints, seven Japanese firms located plants in the United States by 1980. Japanese firms continued production of the most technologically advanced products, especially in Japan but also the U.S., while shifting production of less-advanced products to developing countries in Southeast Asia.

Circa 1997, Japanese children had a relatively large amount of savings, with the average having about 110,000 Japanese yen (about $900 U.S. dollars) in allowances, which stimulated purchases of electronic goods like Tamagotchi.

=== 1950s ===
This decade marked the beginning of the Japanese semiconductor industry, which was driven by relationships established with the United States. The Japanese firms Kobe Kogyo and Sony were at the forefront of this exchange of ideas, working with the RCA and Western Electric, respectively.

==== Kobe Kogyo ====
Kobe Kogyo, later acquired by Fujitsu, became the first company to manufacture and sell transistors in Japan, on the basis of a technology assistance contract signed by Kobe Kogyo president Takao on June 25, 1951. This know-how contract, which granted manufacturing instructions, equipment, and personnel, were exchanged along with a 3% royalty. Tetsuya Arizumi, the Senior Manager of the vacuum tube department at the time, visited RCA's laboratory and factories to initiate a transistor research and development project.

As a result of this success, Takao agreed to expand their contract with RCA to include "all products in the field of weak electricity," including vacuum tubes, radio, television, and transistors. In the same year, Kobe Kogyo became the first Japanese company to commercially produce the solid-state electronic device, and begun making point contact and alloy-junction transistors with the help of RCA's manufacturing technology from the contract. By the end of the decade, Kobe Kogyo sold over $3 million worth of semiconductor devices around the world.

==== Sony ====
In 1953, Sony became the first Japanese company to collaborate with Western Electric (WE), marking a significant step in its technological development. Like Kobe Kogyo, Sony was led by technically trained co-founders, Masaru Ibuka and Akio Morita, who recognized the substantial technology gap between Japan and the West in the aftermath of World War II. As a postwar startup with no prior experience in vacuum-tube manufacturing and a relatively narrow focus, Sony relied on technology importation and strategic partnerships to accelerate its growth and establish itself as a leader in Japan's emerging electronics industry.

Under Ibuka, an engineer for Sony, the company became the first to commercialize a transistor radio in Japan in 1955 (the TR-55), which marked a major leap in consumer electronics. The release of the TR-55 allowed for more compact and portable devices, distinguishing Sony in the consumer electronics market.

==== The Role of Japanese Electronics in the Global Automotive Industry ====
Even though there have been many challenges for the Japanese electronics industry, Japanese companies like Renesas Electronics, Sony, and even Panasonic remain important in automotive technology. Japanese companies remain important in features like lane tracking-assistance, advanced driver-assistance systems, electric vehicle batteries, and entertainment systems. Renesas electronics supplies microcontrollers and processors for major global automakers. These devices are key for autonomic driving and developing more effective electric vehicles. Furthermore, Sony is a significant in the smart mobility space, which focuses on advanced sensor technology and AI products.

=== 21st century ===
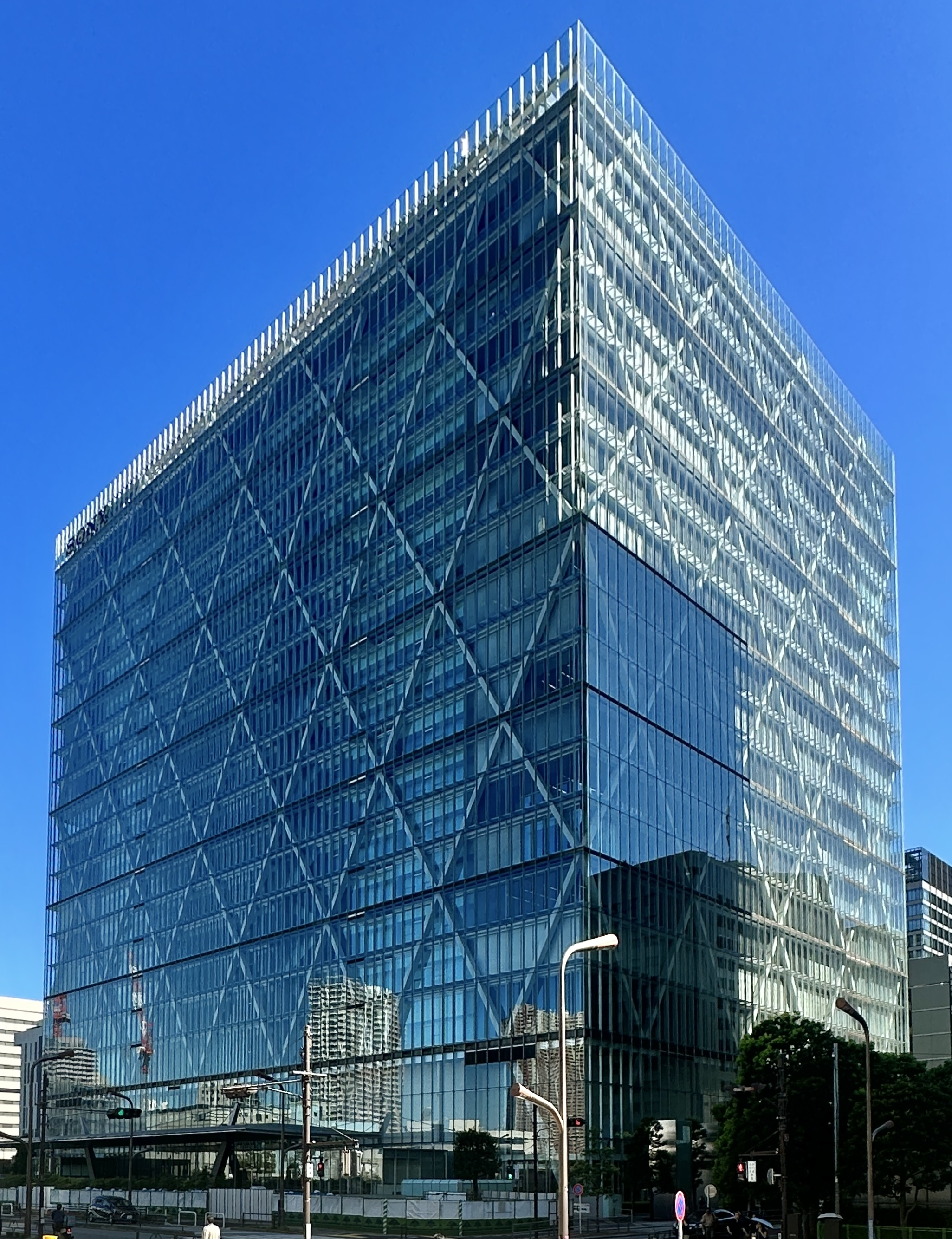
The current headquarters of Sony Corporation in Tokyo

Since the beginning of the 21st century, several of the largest Japanese electronics companies have struggled financially and lost market share, particularly to South Korean, Taiwanese, and Chinese companies. Japanese companies have lost their dominant position in categories including portable media players, TVs, computers, and semiconductors. Affected by the 2008 financial crisis, Sony, Hitachi, Panasonic, Fujitsu, Sharp, NEC, and Toshiba reported losses amounting to $17 billion. The relative decline has been ascribed to factors including high costs, the value of the yen and too many Japanese companies producing the same class of products, causing duplication in research and development efforts and reducing economies of scale and pricing power. Japan's education system has also been highlighted as a possible contributing factor. The lack of adaptation to the Digital Revolution and the shift from hardware to software-oriented product development has also been cited.

One response to the challenges has been a rise in company mergers and acquisitions. JVC and Kenwood merged (forming JVCKenwood), and Renesas Technology and NEC Electronics -the semiconductors arm of NEC- to merge forming Renesas Electronics. In a similar move, in 2009, Panasonic acquired a voting stock majority of Sanyo, making the latter part of the Panasonic Group. Also, some of the bigger players resorted to merging some of their operations, as Hitachi, Casio, NEC, Fujitsu, and Toshiba, did with their cellphone business. On 15 November 2011, facing tough competition from Samsung and LG; Sony, Toshiba, and Hitachi signed a deal to merge their LCD businesses, creating a new company called Japan Display by spring 2012.

As of 2013, most Japanese companies no longer enjoy the same reputation they did about one to two decades ago. Currently, the international electronics consumer market is a competition between Japanese, South Korean, Chinese, Taiwanese, and American industries. Quite a few Japanese companies still have significant international market share. The future of the Japanese electronics industry is debated.

=== Manufacturers ===
The following electronics industry have marketed and sold within Japan:

Japanese

- Akai
- Brother
- Canon
- Casio
- Citizen
- Fujifilm
- Fujitsu
- Hitachi
- JVCKenwood
- Konica Minolta
- Kyocera
- Mitsubishi Electric
- NEC
- Nikon
- Nintendo
- Olympus
- Onkyo
- Panasonic
- Pioneer
- Ricoh
- Seiko Group
- Sharp
- Sony
- TDK
- Toshiba
- Yamaha

Non-Japanese

- Acer
- Apple
- AOC
- Asus
- BlackBerry Limited
- BOE
- Bose Corporation
- Changhong
- Dell
- DJI
- Element Electronics
- Emerson Radio
- Haier
- Harman
- Hisense
- HP
- HTC
- Huawei
- Konka
- Lenovo
- LG
- Magnavox
- Meizu
- OPPO
- Panda Electronics
- Philips
- Razer
- Samsung
- Skyworth
- Sonos
- TCL
- ViewSonic
- Vizio
- Westinghouse
- Xiaomi
- ZTE

== See also ==
- Electronics industry in China
- Japan Electronics and Information Technology Industries Association
