= Sun Wah =

Sun Wah may refer to:

- Sun Wah BBQ, a restaurant in Chicago
- Sunwah Tower, also written as Sun Wah Tower, an office tower in Ho Chi Minh City
- Sunwah - PearL Linux
- Sunwah Linux (rays Linux Distribution)
- UniHan IME
