= Business process outsourcing in China =

Business process outsourcing industry in China

The business process outsourcing industry in China including IT and other outsourcing services for onshore and export markets surpassed 1 trillion yuan (about $145 billion) in 2016 according to the Ministry of Commerce (MOC).

== History ==
The outsourcing industry grew rapidly in the 2000s in China by beginning from an "embryonic" scale. IDC, an IT industry consultancy, estimated in 2006 that while outsourcing of IT services was growing at 30% annually, the market size was only $586 million at the end of 2005. Most IT services then were offered to domestic companies with offshore clients concentrated in Japan.

By 2016, outsourcing was still growing fast at about 20% annually, driven by "cloud computing, big data, Internet of things and mobile Internet" according to Xinhua.

== IT services ==
IT related services accounted for about half of the US$87 billion in total service outsourcing provided to export markets in 2015.

The largest IT outsourcing companies based in China include ChinaSoft and Pactera. One of the largest China-focused outsourcing companies but based in the US is VXI Global. ChinaSoft is backed by Huawei. Pactera was formed in 2012 by the merger of two industry leaders, VanceInfo and HiSoft. VXI Global was acquired in 2016 by the Carlyle Group, a marquee private equity firm, for around US$1 billion. The deal was seen by Dow Jones as "making a big bet that the future of the outsourcing industry, long associated with India, will be in China."

== Painting ==
Art production is outsourced to China either to mass-produce thousands of paintings or execute original works based on instructions from foreign artists. A center for art outsourcing is Dafen Village in Shenzhen, well known for production of imitations of masterworks, but also home to artists who are commissioned to execute original works. At the high end of the art world, outsourcing to China is practice by Kehinde Wiley, an American portrait painter, who opened a studio in Beijing in 2006. Under Wiley's 4 to 10 helpers do the brushstrokes for his paintings.

Cost has been a motivation for outsourcing to China with an art blogger suggesting in 2007 that it allowed those with limited budgets to go from buy posters to oil paintings. Initially, Kehinde Wiley also opened his Beijing studio due to cost sensitivity but by 2012, Wiley told New York magazine that savings costs was no longer the reason for relying on Beijing based-helpers.

== Global competitiveness ==
China has the world's second largest outsourcing industry, taking up 33% of global market share, according to a news release from the Ministry of Commerce of the People's Republic of China in March 2017. The Business Processing Industry Association of India in March 2017 had concurring figures, assessing that China had second largest outsourcing industry, behind India and ahead of the Philippines.
