= P2P video streaming =

P2P video streaming may refer to:

- P2PTV
- Peercasting
