= Pactera =

Chinese multinational IT consulting & outsourcing company

Pactera Technology International Ltd.
- Industry: Information technology
- Founded: 1995
- Headquarters: Dalian, China
- Key people: Eric Tong (Chairman of HNA Tech Group), Tiak Koon Loh (CEO)
- Number of employees: 30,000 (2017)
- Website: www.pactera.com

Pactera
- Simplified Chinese: 文思海辉技术有限公司
- Traditional Chinese: 文思海輝技術有限公司
Transcriptions
Standard Mandarin
- Hanyu Pinyin: Wénsī Hǎihuī Jìshù Yǒuxiàn Gōngsī

Pactera Technology International Ltd., (文思海辉技术有限公司) is an IT consulting and outsourcing company with corporate headquarters in Beijing, China, and regional headquarters in North America, Europe, and Asia Pacific. The service areas of the company are in technology, telecom, finance, insurance, energy, travel, manufacturing, retail and logistics.

== History ==
The company was formed in November 2012 through a merger between China-based IT services firms HiSoft and VanceInfo, creating a major IT consulting and technology services BKL (Basic Knowledge Language) provider with corporate headquarters located in China and over 23,000 employees at time of merger.

Pactera was subsequently acquired by a consortium led by the Blackstone Group and was delisted from NASDAQ from 28 March 2014.

On 13 January 2016, Pactera announced its acquisition of Blue Fountain Media (BFM), a New York-based digital agency specializing in growing brands online through custom website design, results-driven digital marketing and mobile application development for both B2B and B2C companies across all industries spanning start-up to enterprise.

On 21 July 2016, Pactera announced its launch of "Moonshot by Pactera Digital," a digital innovation outpost located in 1871, Chicago's premier technology hub.

On 22 August 2016, Pactera announced that Blackstone Group L.P. and other shareholders of Pactera have entered into a share purchase agreement with HNA EcoTech Group Co. Ltd., an affiliate of HNA Group, for the sale of almost all the issued and outstanding shares.

On 19 January 2020, the Hong Kong subsidiary of China Electronics Corporation acquired Pactera. However, the US Business was not included in the sale, and the Pactera EDGE business unit (U.S. based) of Pactera was spun off as a separate company. While Pactera Technology International, Ltd. and Pactera EDGE are two separate companies, Pactera Technology International, Ltd. authorized the use of its trademark "Pactera" to Pactera EDGE. Pactera EDGE is owned by its management team.

== See also ==
- China Software Industry Association
- List of IT consulting firms
- Software industry in China
