= CCID =

CCID may refer to:

- CCID (protocol), USB protocol
- CCID Consulting, company based in Beijing
- Charging circuit interrupting device
- Credit Card ID, a synonym for Card Security Code
- Coordinating Center for Infectious Diseases, part of the Centers for Disease Control and Prevention
- Cape Town CCID, a Cape Town-based urban management organization
