= Red Flag Linux =

Chinese Linux distribution

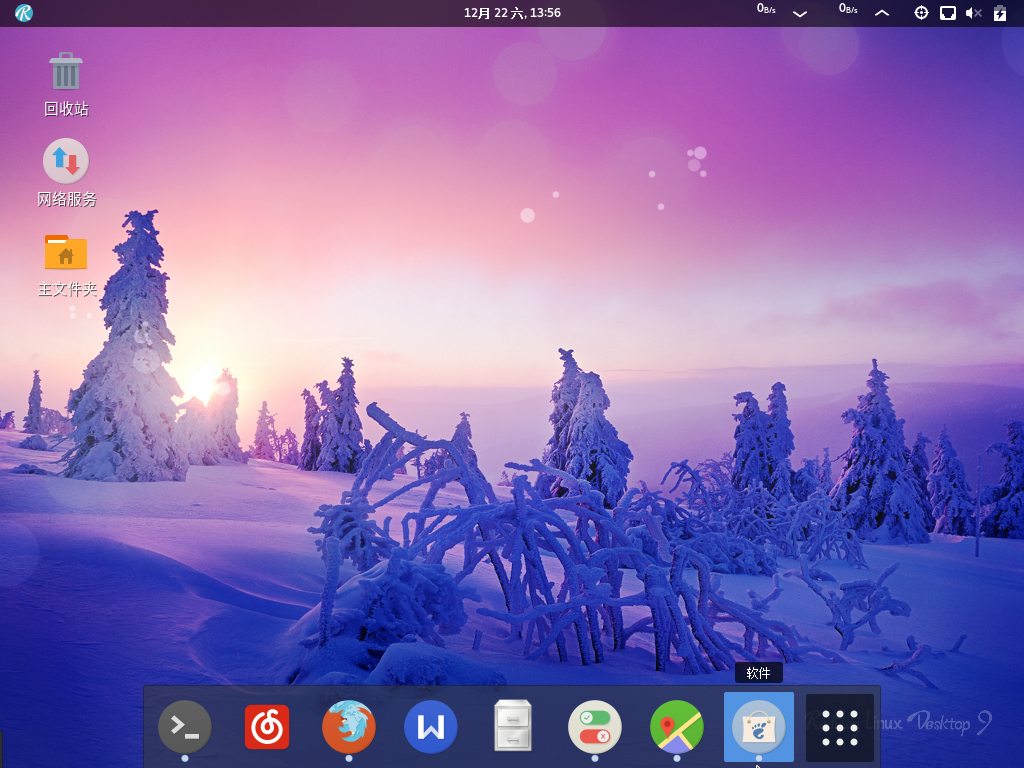
- Screenshot of Red Flag Linux Desktop 9.0
- Developer: Red Flag Software
- OS family: Linux (Unix-like)
- Working state: Current
- Source model: Open source
- Initial release: 1.0 August 1999; 27 years ago
- Latest release: 10.0 / January 2020; 6 years ago
- Kernel type: Monolithic (Linux kernel)
- Default user interface: KDE
- License: Various
- Official website: www.chinaredflag.cn

Red Flag Linux (Chinese: 红旗Linux) is a Linux distribution developed by Red Flag Software. As of 2009, the executive president of Red Flag Software is Jia Dong (贾栋).

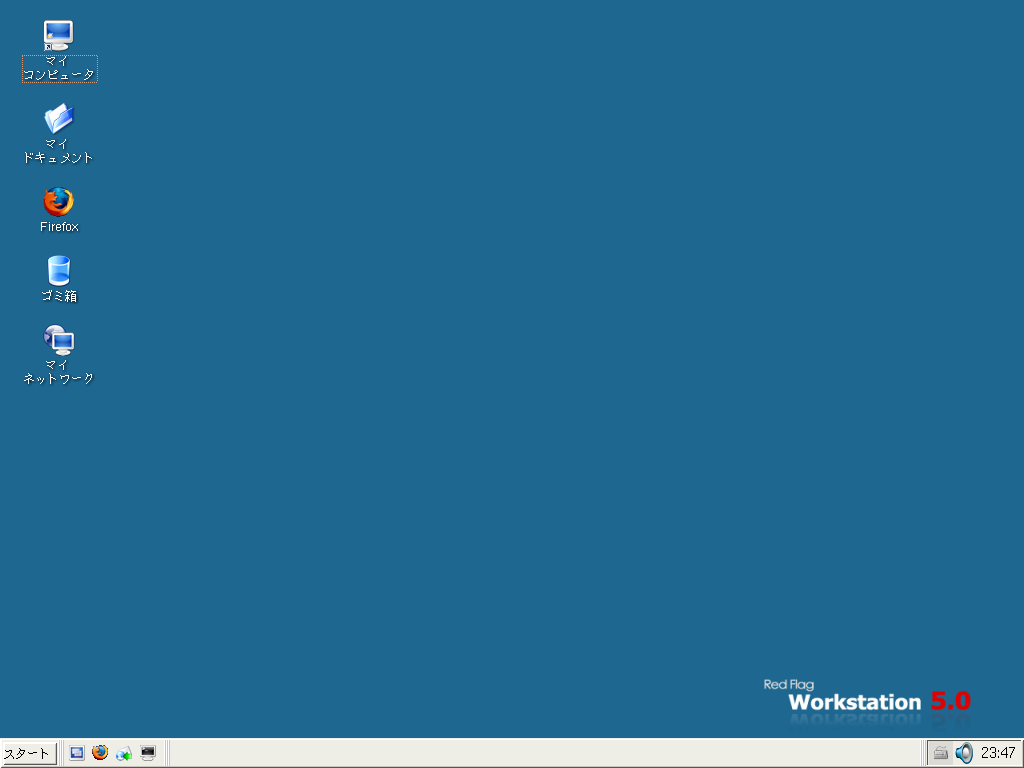
Screenshot of Red Flag Linux Workstation version 5.0 in Japanese

Red Flag Linux provides specialised products, services, and these products:

- Red Flag Asianux Server 8.0
- Red Flag HA Cluster 7.0
- Red Flag Desktop 10 (红旗Linux桌面操作系统v10.0)
- Red Flag Desktop 11 (红旗Linux桌面操作系统v11.0)

The internal structure of Red Flag Linux is very similar to Red Hat Linux, using a similar installer.

== History ==
Red Flag Linux first appeared in August 1999, when it was created by the Institute of Software Research at the Chinese Academy of Sciences. Financial help came from government-owned Shanghai NewMargin Venture Capital. In March 2001, Bloomberg News reported that CCIDNET Investment, a venture capital arm of the Ministry of Industry and Information Technology, had become Red Flag's second largest shareholder.

During a brief standoff with Microsoft in January 2000, in a year-long series of increasing tensions believed to have been tied to Microsoft's perceived mismanagement of its Microsoft Venus venture, Chinese government ministries were ordered to uninstall Windows 2000 from their computers in favor of Red Flag Linux.

In January 2006, Red Flag Linux joined the Open Source Development Labs.

An Equation Group leak from 2017 included tools that targeted Red Flag Linux.

=== 2014 Closure/restructuring ===
On 10 February 2014, Red Flag Software terminated all employment contracts and closed down. The direct cause of the closure was cited as being the failure of the Chinese Academy of Sciences' Software Research Institute to pay a 40 million yuan subsidy. The institute cited Red Flag's failure to complete a specific project, and general mismanagement, as reasons for not paying the subsidy.

According to a research manager with IDC in Beijing, its downfall resulted from a lack of brand awareness and sustained investment, coupled with the rise of rivals.

== Use in Nanchang Internet cafes ==
As of 3 December 2008, it has been reported that Internet cafes in Nanchang, since November 2008, have been required to install the Red Flag Linux as a replacement for pirated versions of the popular Microsoft Windows operating system, or switch to legitimate copies of Microsoft Windows. Radio Free Asia (which is funded by the U.S. government) claimed that Chinese internet cafes were being required to switch to Red Flag Linux even if they were using genuine copies of the Windows OS. This system is provided with a non-expiring support contract at the cost of 5000 yuan (~ US$850, February 2014) for all machines in the cafe.

An official spokesperson for Red Flag Linux clarified by stating that the announcement were targeted to the server-side and not the gaming-intensive (and therefore Windows demanding) client-side computers, and that in the original announcement, Microsoft Windows and Red Flag Linux were simply recommended platforms as they have been tested by the Bureau of Culture.

== See also ==
- Asianux
- China Software Industry Association
- Software industry in China
- Ubuntu Kylin
- Astra Linux – a similar project by the Russian government
- Unity Operating System
- Canaima (operating system) – a similar project by the Venezuelan computer manufacturer VIT, C.A. and Chinese information technology company Inspur
- GendBuntu – a similar project used by Gendarmerie in France
- LiMux – a similar project of the city council of Munich
- Nova (operating system) – a similar project by the Cuban government
- Red Star OS – a similar project by the North Korean government
