= Lenovo LeTV =

Marketing title in Mainland China

Lenovo smart televisions use the Android operating system and are marketed as the "LeTV" in Mainland China.

== Launch ==
In November 2011 Lenovo said it would soon unveil a smart television product called LeTV, expected for release in the first quarter of 2012. "The PC, communications and TV industries are currently undergoing a 'smart' transformation. In the future, users will have many smart devices and will desire an integrated experience of hardware, software and cloud services." Liu Jun, president of Lenovo's mobile-Internet and digital-home-business division. Lenovo unveiled its first smart TV at the 2012 Consumer Electronics Show in Las Vegas. The company said the set would be available for sale in Mainland China in April 2012. During a keynote speech at the Consumer Electronics Show, Paul Jacobs of Qualcomm asked Liu Jun, head of mobile products for Lenovo, to demonstrate the K91. Lenovo released the K91 in Mainland China on 8 May 2012. Lenovo opted to release its first smart television in China because it would be easier to negotiate deals for content in its home market.

== Hardware ==
Lenovo's first smart TV, the LeTV, used the Android 4.0 Ice Cream Sandwich operating system. The LeTV features the ability to display 3D content, a face-recognition feature designed to help parents limit the time their children spend watching TV, and voice recognition. The LeTV will be offered in 42-inch and 55-inch screen sizes. The LeTV also allows smart phones and tablets to be used as remote controls. As the K91 is an Android-based device, it is capable of running hundreds of applications available for download online. Lenovo has created an app store dedicated specifically to the K91.

The LeTV uses a Qualcomm 8060 Snapdragon dual-core processor running at 1.5 GHz, 1 GB of RAM, 8 GB of flash storage, and Android 4 ICS. The LeTV has a five-megapixel webcam built into its bezel. It has a remote and game controllers. The LeTV's remote features a microphone necessary for the TV's voice recognition functions and a track pad. The game controller has track pad, and embedded motion sensor.

In March 2014 Lenovo announced the S9 smart television. Nicknamed the "Terminator", the S9 is based on NVIDIA's powerful Tegra K1 chip. The 50-inch set has 4K resolution and runs a customised version of Android 4.2. The S9 makes use of a small removable module called a Smart Card. The Smart Card is about the size of a deck of cards, has a micro-USB port, a micro SD slot, and a proprietary 70-pin connector that plugs into the TV. The USB port and SD card slot are used for adding storage and accessories. The K1 processor resides in the Smart Card, allowing for future upgrades. The TV is controlled via a Bluetooth remote that connects to the Smart Card and works via two buttons and gesture control.

== Content ==
Lenovo has established a joint venture called iSmarTV with SMG's BesTV to offer high-definition video for streaming to the LeTV. The service currently offers more than 300,000 hours of television shows and movies. Some iSmarTV content is available in 3D.

As of May 2012, more than 1,000 apps have been developed for the LeTV and are available from Lenovo's app store. Forty apps come pre-installed on the LeTV. Apps demoed at the time of the LeTV's release include a web browser, a directory of recipes, and social media tools.

== Partnership with Sharp ==
Lenovo develops its televisions with Sharp, the Japanese electronics manufacturer known for its flat screen displays.

== Name ==
The "Le" series of devices, including the LePhone, LePad, and the LeTV are sold under the "idea" brand outside of China. The "Le" prefix means "happy" in Mandarin Chinese and this branding is only used in Mainland China.

== See also ==
- Funshion
- High Frame Rate
