= Jiangxi University of Finance and Economics =

Public University in Jiangxi, China

- 江西财经大学
- Motto: 信敏廉毅 (Chinese)
- Type: National / Public
- Established: 1923; 103 years ago (Business School)
- Academic affiliations: New York Institute of Technology
- President: Qiao Wang
- Academic staff: 1,395
- Undergraduates: 30,000
- Postgraduates: 4,230
- Location: Nanchang, Jiangxi, China
- Colors: Red
- Website: www.jxufe.edu.cn

Jiangxi University of Finance and Economics
- Simplified Chinese: 江西财经大学
- Traditional Chinese: 江西財經大學
Transcriptions
Standard Mandarin
- Hanyu Pinyin: Jiāngxī Cáijīng Dàxué

The Jiangxi University of Finance and Economics (Chinese: 江西财经大学) is a public, coeducational research university located in Nanchang, the capital city of Jiangxi province, China.

== History ==
Jiangxi University of Finance and Economics (JUFE), founded in 1923 in Nanchang, Jiangxi Province. As one of the six business schools affiliated to the Ministry of Finance, of the People's Republic of China, the university offers programs in business and management.

== Rankings and reputation ==
As of 2022, Jiangxi University of Finance and Economics ranked #2 in East China region after Shanghai University of Finance and Economics and #7 nationwide among universities specialized in finance, business, and economics in the Best Chinese Universities Ranking. As of 2023, Jiangxi University of Finance and Economics has been ranked amongst the top 500 universities in the world in "Business", "Economics", "Finance" and "Management".

As of 2023, JUFE was ranked between the top 1001-1200 among world universities according to the Times Higher Education World University Rankings.

== Notable alumni ==
- Wang Wenjing, billionaire businessman, chairman of Yonyou
