= Seioglobal =

Seioglobal (Former Chinese) (Seio)
- Native name: 晟峰成略 (Hanyu Pinyin: Sheng Feng Cheng Lve)
- Type: Subsidiary - Seiosoft Group
- Industry: Information Technology Service
- Founded: Shanghai, 2003
- Founder: Lixin Ruan (Hanyu Pinyin: Ruan Li Xin)
- Headquarters: Shanghai, People's Republic of China
- Key people: Li Xin Ruan (Co-founder); Mocy Mo (CEO)
- Products: Information Technology Services
- Revenue: ▲$20.76 million USD (2008)
- Number of employees: ▲1,800 (Approx August) (2008)
- Website: www.seioglobal.com

Seioglobal formerly "SSG" / Safesoft Global (Chinese: 晟峰成略; pinyin: Sheng Feng Cheng Lve), (registered as Shanghai Seio Software Technology Co., Ltd) also commonly known locally as "Seio", is an IT service multinational corporation based in Shanghai with focus on providing information technology consulting and software development services to Forbes Global 2000 companies and multinational corporations. In its portfolio it also develops Offshore Development Centers (ODC) for multinational corporations via its almost "no" language barrier talent model and is one of the few companies in its industry in China that owns a 30,000sqm technology software park (Jiaxing Software Park refer to List of technology centers), in addition to its own training and development center.

== History ==
Established on January 27, 2003, at its headquarters, Shanghai, the company developed Information Technology Outsourcing (ITO) and Business Process Outsourcing (BPO) solutions via applying security practices, structured global sourcing methodologies based on the Capability Maturity Model Integration (CMMI).

The company initially traded as "Sheng-feng Co., Ltd." with a registered capital of 4.5 million US dollars and rapidly grew to become one of China's leading IT service companies. As of Dec 2007, the company sat on a US$17.92 million revenue base (from US$1.75 million in 2003) and had 8 offices globally.

Since its founding in 2003 with 15 employees, the company reported a compound annual growth rate (CAGR) of 89%. It achieved Capability Maturity Model Integration (CMMI) Level 3 and began the process for CMMI Level 5 certification. In China, the company is noted for its corporate branding and its association with local entrepreneurship.

On 28 July 2008, due to business development growth and to better serve international markets, once known as SSG (Safesoft Global), the company was re-branded to Seioglobal.

== Critical times ==
In its early stages, the company had to make complex strategic decisions that would lay down the foundation for its development. In doing so, the organization foresaw the need for rapid organizational growth in order to survive the on coming competitive times. During these times, the company was heavily driven by the entrepreneurship spirit.

However, it was not satisfied and reorganized the company via its Japanese roots to diversify it and focused on intensifying independent innovations within Shanghai's surrounding 2nd tier cities such as Wuxi and Jiaxing.

== Upgrading for competition ==
For developing and attracting software development, information services to China's developing metropolitan cities, the company quickly adhered to the nation's "Eleventh Five-Year Plan." Such actions were to shape the strategy for the company for its coming challenging years. and in 2003, the company invested in several strategic 2nd tier metropolitan cities in China and opened up offices in Tokyo and Osaka in Japan.

== See also ==
- Software industry in China
- China Software Industry Association
