= Neusoft =

Chinese company

Neusoft Corporation 东软集团
- Company type: Publicly held company
- Traded as: SSE: 600718
- Industry: Software Development, IT Education, Medical Equipment and Systems
- Founded: 1991 (as Shenyang Neu-Alpine Software Co., Ltd)
- Headquarters: Shenyang, China (registered in Shanghai)
- Key people: Liu Jiren (Chairman and CEO); Wang Yongfeng (President and Director); Kutsuzawa Gentaro (Vice Chairman of the Board)
- Products: List: BW (Image Review Workstation Series); CRM (Customer Relationship Management); Digital Signage Network/Systems; Enterprise Asset Management; Group Financial Management & Control Systems; Medial Equipment; Network Security Operations Center (NetEye); OpenBASE; PACS/RIS; SEAS; SkillBase; TalentBase
- Services: List: Application Development and Maintenance; Business Process Outsoursing; ERP Consulting and Implementation; IT Infrastructure Service; IT Education and Training; Professional Testing and Performance Engineering; Software Globalization and Localization; Telemedicine; Telematics; Xiang
- Revenue: ▲RMB 6,960 million (2012) ▲RMB 5,751 million (2011) ▲RMB 4,937 million (2010)
- Number of employees: 20,000 (2015)

Chinese name
- Simplified Chinese: 东软集团
- Traditional Chinese: 東軟集團
- Literal meaning: Neusoft Corporation
Transcriptions
Standard Mandarin
- Hanyu Pinyin: Dōngruǎn Jítuán
- Website: www.neusoft.com

Neusoft Corporation is a Chinese multinational provider of software engineering services, Information Technology services, product engineering services, IT education and medical equipment headquartered in Shenyang, China.

"Neusoft" is an acronym of Northeastern University Software.

The company was founded in 1991 and, as of 2023, is the largest China-based company providing IT services and, as of 2012, the largest software outsourcing firm in China. Neusoft has subsidiaries in United States (Livonia, Michigan, Santa Clara, California, Morrisville, North Carolina), Japan (Tokyo), Switzerland (Appenzell), Germany (Hamburg, Munich) and Romania (Cluj-Napoca).

== History ==
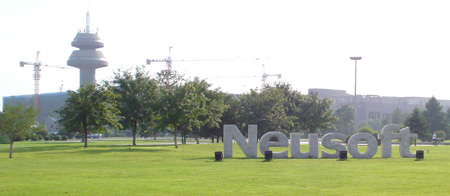
Neusoft Group's Headquarters in Shenyang, China

Neusoft was founded by Northeastern University professors Liu Jiren and Li Huatian in 1988 as the Computer Software and Network Engineering Research Laboratory of Northeastern University. It had an initial allocation of three people, three computers, and capital of RMB 30,000.

In 1990 it became the NEU Computer Software Research and Development Centre. It was incorporated in 1991. They had a collaboration with Alpine Electronics of Japan and the venture was called Neu-Alpine Software Research Institute. Through technical export and software outsourcing, this made Alpine their first international customer. The entity then became the Neu-Alpine Software Co. Ltd in 1993. As CEO, Liu Jiren led the company in these developments.

The first stages of construction of Neusoft Park began in 1995; around the same time, Neusoft incorporated the NEU Computer Imaging Centre and began to investigate CT scanning and related medical technologies. The NEU Software Group Ltd. was founded in 1996; one of its early collaborations was with Toshiba. In 1996, Neusoft became the first listed software company in China, with an offering on the Shanghai Stock Exchange. A partnership with Bao Steel in 1998 broadened the firm's investor base.

In 2003 there was a consolidation of investments as part of which Alpine Electronics, Toshiba, Bao Steel, and other investors became shareholders of Neusoft Group. By 2004, Neusoft had some 6,000 employees across 40 offices around China and the world with sales of RMB 2.4 billion.

By 2009 it was known as China's largest software outsourcing company. It was however still well behind Indian giants in the sector such as Tata Group and Infosys. By 2010 it had revenues of $540 million across a base of 15,000 employees, with some 8,000 corporate entities as customers. Historically most of their customers are in China and Japan.

By 2015, Neusoft said it had a staff of over 20,000, with six software bases, eight regional centres, and a presence in over forty cities throughout China.

== Operations ==
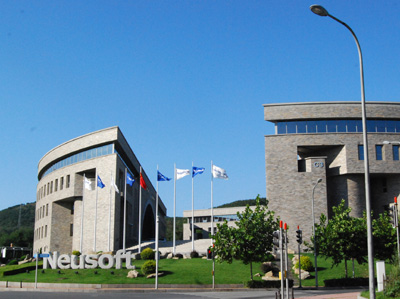
Neusoft Group's Development Center in Dalian, China

Neusoft is categorized into five main businesses: IT services, software products, medical equipment, IT education, software and services.

=== Software and services ===
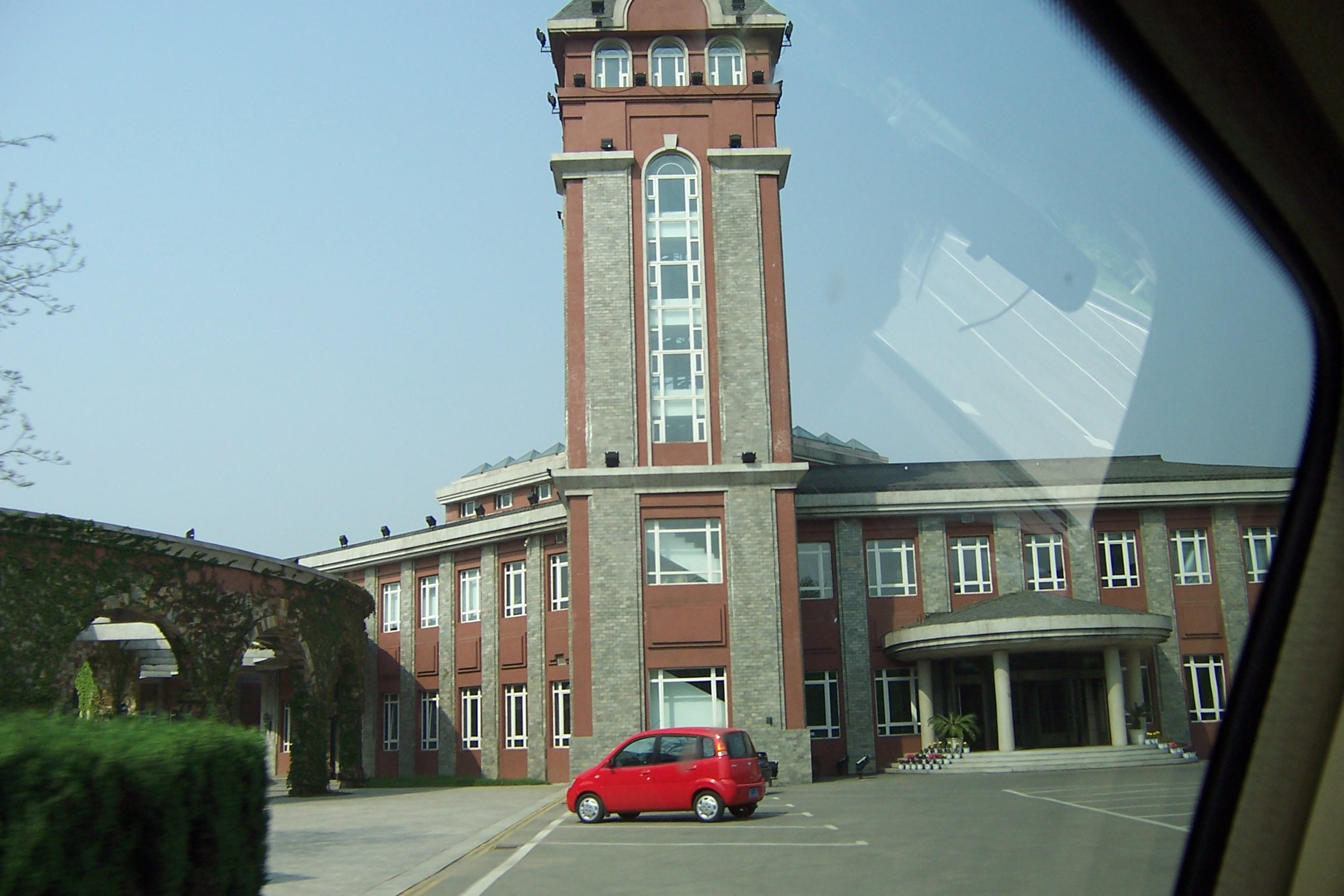
A software systems office and conference building on Neusoft's Shenyang campus

Neusoft offers a wide range of services, including Engineering Services, On-demand Services, Business Process Outsourcing (BPO), as well as IT Education and Training. Engineering Services provides global customers with full-life cycle services for Application Development and Maintenance, Enterprise resource planning consulting and implementation, IT Infrastructure Services, Software Globalization and Localization, Professional Testing & Performance Engineering.

Regarding On-demand Services, Neusoft offers Telemedicine, which is tele-consultation services and medical products, and Xikang, is an integrated all-life-cycle healthcare service platform.

Neusoft's business process outsourcing services include Contact Center Service, Finance & Accounting Outsourcing, human resource outsourcing, Web Content Management, and IT Support.

In 2007 Neusoft was granted ISO/IEC 27001 certification and thus became the first company to be so certified in China for both software outsourcing and business process outsourcing.

=== Medical equipment ===
Neusoft's technology accumulation and R&D experience in the fields of embedded software, image reconstruction, and data processing has provided technical support to Neusoft and its partners in its development of medical equipment. These include over 40 types of medical products in eight categories: CT scanner, MRI, X-ray, Ultrasound, Laser Imager, Clinical Lab Equipment, Holter monitor, and related Consumables.

The company's e-Hospital technology incorporates hospital information system, Picture Archiving and Communication System, and telemedicine systems.

=== IT Education ===
Neusoft operates four IT Education and Training institutes in Shenyang, Dalian, Chengdu, and Nanhai. The four industrial development bases and service platforms are collectively known as Neusoft Parks or Neusoft Institutes of Information.

The main university campus (where the company was founded) is Northeastern University Biomedical and Information Engineering School in Shenyang.

List of Neusoft educational institutes:

- Dalian Neusoft University of Information
- Chengdu Neusoft University
- Neusoft Institute Guangdong

== International partnerships ==
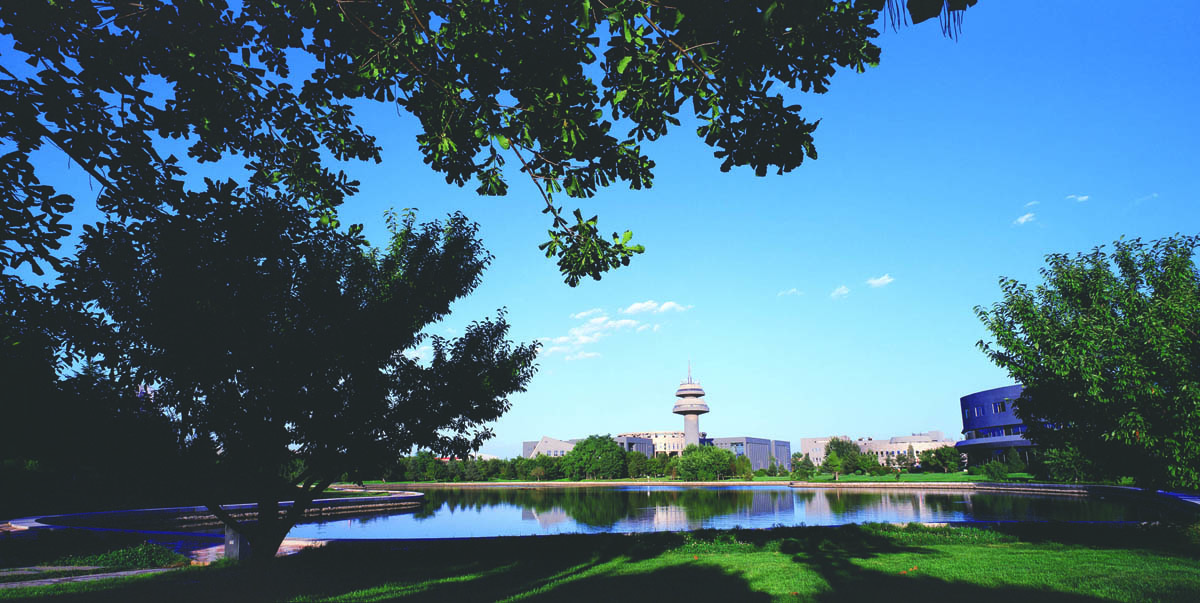
Longer view of the headquarters in Shenyang

Neusoft's partners in the United States include: Boeing, Cisco, EMC Corporation, HP, Hewitt Associates, Dell, IBM, Intel, Microsoft, Motorola, Oracle Database, and Symantec.

Among Neusoft's partnerships in Japan are: Alpine Electronics, Fujitsu, Hitachi, Itochu, NEC, Panasonic, Sony, and Toshiba.

European partners include: Nokia Siemens Networks, SAP AG, Philips and Sony Ericsson.

== Industry recognition ==
- In 2009 Neusoft was named to Global Services Media's "Global Services 100", and placed in the top ten of "Best Performers: IT Services" and "Leaders: Human Capital Development".

== See also ==
- Dalian Neusoft University of Information
- Chengdu Neusoft University
- List of IT consulting firms
- Dalian Software Park
- Electronic information industry in China
- Software industry in China
- China Software Industry Association
