= Unihan =

Unihan primarily refers to:

- Han unification, an effort by Unicode/ISO 10646 to map Han characters into a single set, ignoring regional variations
- Unihan database, a web data file maintained by the Unicode Consortium

Unihan may also refer to:

- CJK Unified Ideographs, the Unicode set of common (shared) Chinese, Japanese and Korean characters
- UniHan IME, an input method based on the IIIMF framework
- Unihan font, a Unicode font developed by Ross Paterson in 1993
- UNIHAN, Leibniz University Hannover
- Unihan Corporation, Taiwanese contract manufacturer (but an old name for Pegatron)
