= Chinese Software Developer Network =

CSDN
- Website type: Internet forum
- Available in: Chinese (simplified)
- Website: csdn.net
- Commercial: Yes
- Launched: March 1999; 27 years ago

The Chinese Software Developer Network or China Software Developer Network (CSDN; Chinese: 中国开发者网络; pinyin: Zhōngguó Kāifā Zhě Wǎngluò) operated by Bailian Midami Digital Technology Co., Ltd., is one of the biggest networks of software developers in China. CSDN provides Web forums, blog hosting, IT news, and other services. CSDN has about 10 million registered users and is the largest developer community in China.

== Services offered ==
- Web forums with a ranking system and similar topics
- Blog hosting , with 69,484 bloggers at April 7, 2005
- Document Center , a selection of blog articles
- IT News
- IT job hunting and training services
- Online bookmark service

=== Web Forum ===
The CSDN community website is where Chinese software programmers seek advice. A poster describes a problem, posts it in the forum with a price in CSDN points, and then waits for replies. On some popular boards, a poster will get a response in a few hours, if not minutes. Most replies are short but enough to point out the mistake and give possible solutions. Some posts include code and may grow to several pages. The majority of posts are written in Simplified Chinese, although Traditional Chinese and English posts are not uncommon. .

Topics are mainly IT related and focused on programming, but political and life topics are also active. The forums were closed for two weeks in June 2004. This was likely for political reasons, because many political words, such as the names of political leaders and organizations, have been banned in posts since then. However, political discussions with intentional misspellings are still active.

=== Blog ===
The site hosts many IT blogs, but the large number of bloggers makes the server slow. In December 2005, Baidu rated CSDN as one of the top Chinese blog service providers.

== Collaboration with Microsoft ==
CSDN started cooperation with Microsoft in 2002, and several Microsoft technical support staff have provided their support in CSDN forums since then. CSDN is also a major source of Chinese Microsoft Most Valuable Professionals.

== Criticism ==
Some people have complained about the CPU-consuming XML page format of the web forum. Others have complained about its unfriendly interface in browsers other than Internet Explorer. Nevertheless, the website receives 1.3 million hits every day, according to Alexa.

== User information leakage ==
In December 2011, the information of 6,000,000 CSDN users was reported to be leaked. This serious security problem was caused by storing user's passwords in clear text without any hashing/encryption in the CSDN database.

== See also ==
- Software industry in China
- China Software Industry Association
