= Witkey =

Witkey (威客; Wei Ke in Pinyin) is a web-based system whereby users can exchange and purchase services and information, share knowledge and experience in order to save time and money.

Generally, requests posted are of the type not easily answered on a general internet search engine and can be of either a personal or professional nature. Students and professionals alike post requests for help with research and even answers to homework. More and more of these requests are being posted on one of the ever-growing number of Witkey websites. There are 338 million internet users (or netizens) in China and this is increasing. The number of recorded Witkey users in China is estimated at 600,000 and is set to increase to 9 million by 2007 according to the Beijing-based CCID Consulting Co.

The requests are usually answered for a small fee which is worked out in points through the company running the Witkey website itself, which in turn are exchangeable for cash. From RMB 50 for a quick know-how answer to a small technological query to around RMB 1,000 to help a company come up with a logo design, with even higher amounts being paid out for more diverse services such as scientific research and analysis.

The Witkey industry is predicted to grow as it proves popular with providers and clients alike, results are generally good and although the work can be demanding it can be done from home and the hours are flexible and, since you only need an internet connection to take on work as a Witkey, even those in remote areas are able to get in on the action as all of the services provided are carried out over the internet.

There are of course some negative points to the system which relies heavily on trust between providers and clients and provisions are seen to be taken to allow for a more comprehensive monitoring of the Witkey system in the future.

A latest research by CCW Research shows that 51.2% interviewees think that the most important task for Witkey sites presently is to improve consumer experience, facilitating customer activities of task publication and worker/works’ match, as well as securing personal privacy etc. Analyst CCW Research points out that Witkey site operators have to treat this problem seriously and work out a series of high-level service on customers’ stand. It is believed that the improvement of consumer experience will help to build a good fame of Witkey website and new customers and Witkey workers will be gathered nonstoply.

There are 9.7 percent interviewees expect a better clustering and more detailed classification of Witkey websites as skilled workers are not willing to participate in an irrelevant working project while customers doubt about abilities of Witkey workers.

witkey(威客; Wei Ke in Pinyin) is a synthesis of word, its literal translation is the key to open the wisdom. Translation is to use the wisdom of the masses to solve the difficulties of a person or a difficult matter, so that the parties out of the woods, get the correct answer in an effective way.
