= HiSoft =

HiSoft Technology International Limited
- Type: Public
- Traded as: SEHK: 992; Nasdaq: HSFT
- Industry: IT Outsourcing
- Founded: November 1996; 29 years ago
- Headquarters: Dalian, China
- Key people: Cheng-Yaw Sun (chairman); Tiak Koon Loh (CEO)
- Website: www.hisoft.com

HiSoft Technology International Limited was a multinational information technology and business process outsourcing company headquartered in Dalian, China. Founded in 1996, HiSoft was listed on the NASDAQ public exchange in 2010. In November 2012, the company merged with China-based IT outsourcing industry peer VanceInfo to form Pactera.

== History ==
HiSoft was founded in 1996 as Dalian Haihui Sci-Tech Co., Ltd. In 2002, the company established a Japan-based subsidiary, Haihui Sci-Tech Japan Co., Ltd., later renamed HiSoft Japan Co., Ltd. In 2004, HiSoft Technology International Limited, a Cayman Islands holding company had been formed with other units as wholly owned subsidiaries. They received venture capital funding from investors including Draper Fisher Jurvetson ePlanet Ventures, GGV Capital, GE Commercial Finance, International Finance Corporation, Intel Capital JAFCO Asia, Mitsubishi UFJ Securities, and Sumitomo Corporation Equity Asia Limited.

With their initial public offering of $64–$74 million in American depositary shares on June 30, 2010, HiSoft became the 144th Chinese company to be listed on the NASDAQ public exchange. In July 2011, hiSoft acquired NouvEON Technology Partners, based in Charlotte, North Carolina. HiSoft acquired BearingPoint Australia for an undisclosed sum in July 2012.

== Operations ==
HiSoft delivered software development, globalization, testing, and maintenance services to customers in the Americas, Europe and Asia, with focus on Fortune 500 firms in the telecommunication, software, financial services, pharmaceutical and manufacturing sectors. For 2009, the company reported approximately 35% of HiSoft's clients were Fortune 500, representing over 55% of revenue. They also reported 60% of their clients from US and Europe, 30% from Japan, and 10% from China. HiSoft's workforce grew from about 3000 at the end of 2007 to over 5000 in September 2010.

HiSoft was the only Chinese company included on the 2010 Global Outsourcing 100 list of the International Association of Outsourcing Professionals, (in the list since its inception in 2006) and was in the top ten leaders in China and Japan.

In addition to acquiring Envisage, Ensemble International and Teksen Systems, hiSoft established operations in the US, Singapore and Japan through acquisitions, partnerships and joint ventures.

== See also ==
- Software industry in China
- China Software Industry Association
- Dalian Software Park
