= Li Huatian =

Chinese computer scientist

- Born: January 29, 1922; Songjiang, Jiangsu (now Songjiang, Shanghai)
- Education: National Southwestern Associated University, Harvard University
- Scientific career
- Fields: Electrical Engineering
- Workplaces: Dalian University of Technology, Northeastern University

Li Huatian
- Traditional Chinese: 李華天
- Simplified Chinese: 李华天
Transcriptions

Professor Li Huatian (1922–2007) was one of the first few computer scientists in China and was well known for his early contributions to the areas of computer science and computer networks.

== Life and work ==
He was born on January 29, 1922 in Songjiang, Jiangsu (now Songjiang, Shanghai). He graduated from the National Southwestern Associated University with a degree in electrical engineering in 1943 and from Harvard University with a master's degree in 1948.

He returned to China in 1949 to start his research and teaching career as a university professor. He taught at Dalian University of Technology and Northeastern University. He served as the department chair of the departments of Automation and Computer Science and the university vice president at Northeastern University.

He also served as a vice president for IFAC, the International Federation of Automatic Control. He resigned administration positions in 1984 to return to full-time research and teaching. Meanwhile, he founded the first PhD program in computer science in China.

Till his final retirement in 1995, he had published numerous journal papers in areas of automatic control, computer theory, computer networks, and multimedia systems and brought up a lot of younger computer scientists in China. He also co-founded the Neusoft Group in early 1990s with his PhD student Liu Jiren. Professor Li died on January 24, 2007 in Shenzhen, China.
