= Chengdu Neusoft University =

University in Chengdu, China

Coordinates: 30.88882°N 103.59675°E

- 成都东软学院 (Chinese)
- Motto: To Learn and to Apply
- Type: Private
- Established: 2003
- President: Zhang Yinghui (张应辉)
- Students: 10,000
- Location: Chengdu, Sichuan, China
- Campus: 400,000 m^{2}
- Website: CNU website (English); CNU website (Chinese)

Chinese name
- Simplified Chinese: 成都东软学院
- Traditional Chinese: 成都東軟學院
Transcriptions
Standard Mandarin
- Hanyu Pinyin: Chéngdū Dōngruǎn Xuéyuàn

Chengdu Neusoft University (abbreviated CNU, Chinese: 成都东软学院) was founded by Neusoft Holdings in 2003 and is located in Dujiangyan, Chengdu, Sichuan province, China.

It is the first independent private undergraduate college in the history of Sichuan Province.

== Environment ==
There are many tourist attractions near Chengdu Neusoft University, such as Mount Qingcheng, Jiezi Historic Town, Dujiangyan Irrigation Project and so on.

== See also ==
- Liu Jiren
- Neusoft
- Dalian Neusoft University of Information
