= Funshion =

Peer-to-peer streaming site in China

- Initial release: 1 June 2004
- Stable release: 2.8.5.24 / 20 December 2012; 13 years ago
- Operating system: Windows, iOS, Android
- Platform: Peer-to-peer streaming Internet video
- Size: 6.2 MB
- Available in: Chinese
- License: Freeware
- Website: fun.tv

Funshion
- Traditional Chinese: 風行網
- Simplified Chinese: 风行网
- Literal meaning: Popular network
Transcriptions
Standard Mandarin
- Hanyu Pinyin: fēngxíngwǎng
- IPA: [fə́ŋɕǐŋwàŋ]

Funshion is a Chinese peer-to-peer streaming video network software and website. The vast majority of content is from East Asia, mostly Mainland China, Japan, Korea. It provides a free streaming service and also has its own brand of smart TV.

== Company ==
Beijing Funshion Online Technology Co Ltd was established in 2005. The company initially focused on broadcast, content search and distributing streaming media. Funshion Online was officially founded on September 28, 2005, with headquarters in Beijing, China. The company later partnered with SMG's BesTV.

In January 2016, Luo Jiangchun was Funshion's CEO, and the company was working on product development with other companies such as Shanghai Oriental Pearl Media Co Ltd, Shenzhen MTC Co Ltd, Haier, Panda Electronics Group, and Gome Electrical Appliances Holding Ltd. On December 10, 2016, Funshion released its first smart TV model.

== Applications ==
Funshion Online Technologies Ltd develops video software and offers online video and audio platforms. In particular, Funshion provides on demand TV programs and movies to broadband users. Funshion uses peer-to-peer streaming technology and supports high-volume traffic. At one point the company claimed the site had 290,000,000 registered users and 60,000,000 daily users.

== See also ==
- PPLive
- QQLive
