= Dalian Neusoft University of Information =

Private university in Dalian, China

- 大连东软信息学院 (Chinese)
- Motto: To Learn and To Apply
- Type: Private
- Established: 2000
- Affiliations: Hanseatic League of Universities (HLU)
- President: Wen Tao (温涛)
- Students: 16,000
- Location: Dalian, Liaoning, China
- Campus: 830,000 m^{2}
- Website: DNUI website (English); DNUI website (Chinese)

Chinese name
- Simplified Chinese: 大连东软信息学院
- Traditional Chinese: 大連東軟信息學院
Transcriptions
Standard Mandarin
- Hanyu Pinyin: Dàlián Dōngruǎn Xìnxī Xuéyuàn

Dalian Neusoft University of Information (abbreviated DNUI, Chinese: 大连东软信息学院), formerly known as Neusoft Institute of Information, is a private university with few campuses in Dalian, Foshan and Chengdu within China, specializing in information technology.

Dalian Neusoft University of Information is ranked 91st in WURI Global Top 100 Innovative Universities Ranking 2022.

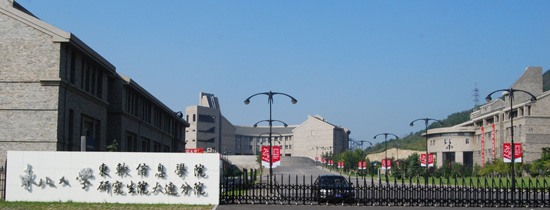
The Dalian Campus, Dalian Neusoft University of Information, Northeastern University, China

== History ==
The Dalian Neusoft University of Information opened in Dalian (Liaoning province) as a joint venture of Neusoft Group (60%) and Dalian Software Park Co., Ltd. (40%), as a private university attached to Northeastern University, Shenyang.

In 2001, the Neusoft Institute Guangdong (Formerly known as Nanhai Neusoft Institute of Information) opened at Nanhai Software Park in Foshan (Guangdong province), as well as the Chengdu Neusoft University in Dujiangyan, near Chengdu (Sichuan Province).

During the Sichuan earthquake in 2008, the campus at Chengdu was damaged. Approximately 3,000 students had to move to the Dalian campus.

== Academics ==
Each year, 4,000 new students are admitted to the Dalian campus.

DNUI offers following subjects:

- Information Science
- Information Management
- Embedded Software
- Animation
- English Taught by native teachers
- Japanese Taught by native teachers

The university houses an electronic library.

=== Accreditation and memberships ===
DNUI is a member of SAP University Alliances.

=== Partner institutions ===
DNUI has established partnerships with many universities in multiple countries and regions including Australia, Japan, Russia, United Kingdom and United States.

Below are the partial list of DNUI's institutions partners:

- Australia
  - Australian National University
  - Swinburne University of Technology
  - University of Adelaide
  - University of Queensland
  - University of South Australia
- Japan
  - Waseda University
  - Ritsumeikan University
  - Sophia University
  - Chiba University
  - Hokuriku University
  - Kokushikan University
  - University of Aizu
  - Nagoya Institute of Technology
  - Shibaura Institute of Technology
  - Asia University
  - University of East Asia
  - J. F. Oberlin University
  - Kyoto Sangyo University
  - Okayama Shoka University
  - Josai International University
  - Nagasaki University of Foreign Studies
  - Hokkaido Information University
  - Kyoto College of Graduate Studies for Informatics
- Russia
  - Russian University of Transport
  - Altai State University
- United Kingdom
  - Durham University
  - Lancaster University
  - University of East Anglia
  - University of Sussex
- United States
  - Montclair State University

=== Rankings and reputation ===
==== WURI Global Top 100 Innovative Universities Rankings ====
Year	Rank	Valuer
2021	97	WURI Global Top 100 Innovative Universities Rankings
2022	91	WURI Global Top 100 Innovative Universities Rankings

== See also ==
- Liu Jiren
- Neusoft
- Chengdu Neusoft University
