= LiveStation =

Former television and radio online distributor

LiveStation Ltd.

- Screenshot
- Available in: English
- Founded: September 7, 2007; 19 years ago
- Headquarters: The Trampery; 13-19 Bevenden Street; London, United Kingdom
- Area served: Worldwide (except blocked countries)
- Chairperson: Philip Rowley
- CEO: Lippe Oosterhof
- Services: Internet TV
- Net income: US$3 million (2015)
- Employees: 10
- Parent: Microsoft Research
- Website: www.livestation.com
- Advertising: No
- Registration: Mandatory (sign up / sign in via Facebook or Twitter); as of early-2015
- Launched: September 24, 2008; 18 years ago
- Current status: Defunct (as of 23 November 2016)

LiveStation
- Developers: Skinkers Ltd; Microsoft Research; Livestation Ltd
- Release: July 2007 (announced); September 7, 2007 (IBC 2007 - Amsterdam); February 12, 2008 (beta release); September 24, 2008 (full release)
- Platform: cross-platform including iOS, Android Former: Microsoft Windows, Apple Macintosh, Linux
- Available in: English
- Type: Internet TV
- License: Proprietary
- Website: www.livestation.com

Livestation was a platform for distributing live television and radio broadcasts over a data network. It was originally developed by Skinkers Ltd. and is now an independent company called Livestation Ltd. The service was originally based on peer-to-peer technology acquired from Microsoft Research. Between mid-June 2013 and mid-July Livestation was unavailable to some subscribers due to technical issues.

In late 2016, the service closed down without notice.

== Overview ==
Livestation aggregated international news channels online and offered them in some ways:

- Free to watch: Some channels could be watched for free on the Livestation website or on their desktop player, a freely downloadable video application that presented all the channels through one interface.
- Premium service: Some of the free channels were also available on a subscription basis both in higher quality (800 kbit/s) and in lower (256 kbit/s) delivered via an international content distribution network for higher reliability.
- Mobile: Livestation launched BBC World News on the iPhone in 16 European countries and Al Jazeera English globally. The apps were available in the iOS AppStore and streamed the live TV channel 24/7 on both Wi-Fi and 3G connections.

Livestation broadcast streams are encoded in VC-1 format (Livestation is not currently using peer-to-peer). Playback controls were overlaid on top of the video stream. Unlike services such as Joost which offer video-on-demand channels, Livestation streams live broadcasts.

Livestation provided a website, mobile website and native applications for the iOS, Android, Nokia and Blackberry handsets. Early models of Samsung TV were also supported. They also provided desktop software available for Windows, Mac (including PowerPC) and Linux. The cross-platform compatibility of the desktop software was facilitated by the Qt framework. Social networking features were later added that include the ability to chat with other viewers and also find out what others are watching through a user-generated rating system. You could search and select the available channels either from the website or from within the software.

In the first quarter of 2011 by 1047 percent, resulting in the first profitable quarter in its history.

Between mid-June and mid-July 2013, Livestation suffered a prolonged series of technical issues and was unavailable to some users.

In early 2015, Livestation re-branded their entire site changing what channels were offered and bringing in an interactive feature. Some stations on the app were not on the main site and vice versa.

== Available channels ==
Stations available until closure and former live TV news channels in the global offering (which comes with a default installation) included, as of 2016:

- ABS-CBN News Channel
- Al Aan TV
- Al-Alam News Network
- Al Arabiya
- Al Jazeera
- Al Jazeera English
- Al Jazeera Mubasher
- Al Mayadeen
- Al Nabaa TV
- BBC Arabic
- BBC Persian
- BBC World News
- BBC World Service Radio
- CNBC
- CNBC Arabiya (EMEA)
- Bloomberg TV
- BBC News Channel
- CCTV News
- CNC World
- CNN International
- C-SPAN
- Democratic Voice of Burma
- Deutsche Welle TV and radio
- eNCA
- Euronews
- Espreso TV
- Fox News Radio
- France24
- HispanTV
- i24news
- Kurdast News
- Libya TV
- NASA TV
- NHK World News
- One News
- Press TV
- RFI Afrique and Monde.
- Reuters TV
- Russia Today
- SAMAA TV
- Sky News Arabia
- Sky News International
- TeleSUR
- United Nations Television
- UNHCR TV
- VOA Persian

As of 2016, the Livestation site is closed.

== See also ==
- IPTV
- Internet Television
- TVUnetworks
