= Microsoft Venus =

Aborted Chinese business venture

Microsoft Venus was an abandoned venture by Microsoft into the low-end personal computing market in the People's Republic of China. The product, a set-top operating system designed to work with low-end televisions (somewhat similar to MSN TV in the United States), was announced by then-Microsoft chairman Bill Gates on March 10, 1999 in Shenzhen, and was to be made available by January 2000; it never made it out of Microsoft's lab however, slowly dying less than a year after its announcement.

== History ==
Relatively little is known about Microsoft Venus, since the project never made it beyond the prototype stage, and was designed to be exclusive to the People's Republic of China. What is known of the project appears to show that Microsoft designed Venus in response to a largely untapped Chinese computing market; with their low-end set-top box, designed to be a combination of Internet accessibility and the basic features of a personal computer (such as a rudimentary word processor), they hoped to tap into this market, gaining market share and profit in the world's fastest-growing economy in the process.

Despite initial support from the Chinese government — which included, but was not limited to, discounts and assorted subsidies — and lucrative distribution agreements with Acer, Philips, Lenovo, and a few other companies, the planned venture faced many problems, the largest of which was a massive cost overrun. The units were reported to sell for up to 3,000 yuan (or US$360 at the time), which was then a large sum for the general Chinese public.

As 1999 progressed and 2000 began, the Chinese government's relations with Microsoft continued to sour over production costs of the Venus. This tension reached a fever pitch in January 2000, when the Chinese government ordered Windows 2000 uninstalled from all ministerial computers, opting to use the locally produced Red Flag Linux instead.

January 2000 passed without a Venus release, and the product remained "vaporware". After Microsoft's aforementioned brief showdown with the Chinese government that same month, all talk of Venus appears to have ceased in the news media. Venus was never released, and with it went Microsoft's attempt at selling low-cost computing to the Chinese masses.

== Aftermath ==
While Microsoft's first attempt at bringing computing to the Chinese masses was a failure, later events have proved more favorable to the company. Lenovo's purchase of IBM's Windows-based computing division in 2005 gave the consumer electronics corporation, which is partially owned by the Chinese government, a strong presence in the Windows computing market both at home in China and abroad that has persisted since the initial acquisition. However, Lenovo's computers are full-fledged PCs, and do not bear a strong resemblance to the all-in-one television component that Microsoft envisioned becoming a large success in China.

== Specifications ==
According to Reuters' account of the initial unveiling of the Venus prototype, the box was intended to combine a web browser, rudimentary word processing and graphic design suite, and CD player into one set-top television component. Gates touted the computer as having "learning capabilities". This ability was intended to be combined with a contract with forty Chinese governmental ministries to produce an application known as "Government Online", which would have served the stated purpose of bringing the Chinese bureaucracy closer to the masses.

Microsoft reportedly intended for the Venus boxes to run on a special version of Windows CE, fine-tuned for display on television sets.

Exact processor speeds were never released by Microsoft, but were believed to be comparable to that of low-end Windows computers at that time.

== See also ==
- MSN TV
- Science and technology in China
- Set-top box
