= Reuters TV =

Mobile video news service by Reuters

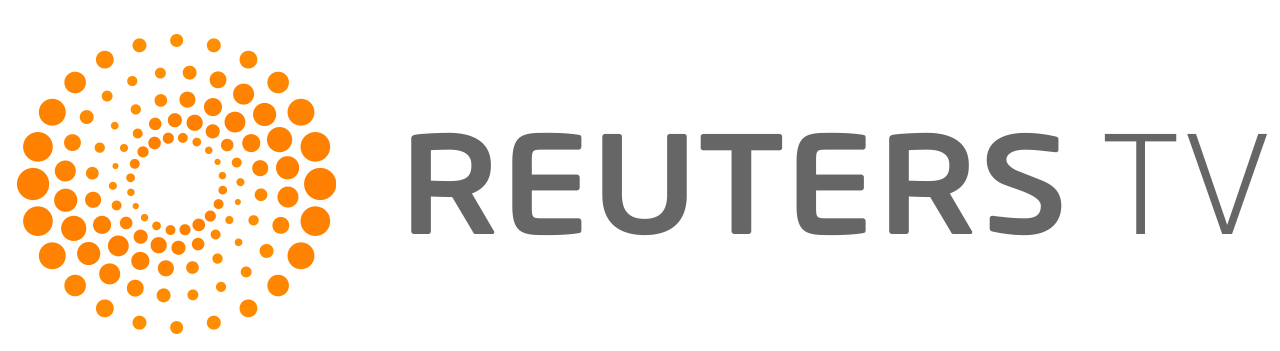
- Type: Internet streaming
- Country: United States
- Availability: iOS; Android webOS
- Owner: Thomson Reuters
- Key people: Don Colarusso, Executive Editor
- Launch date: February 4, 2015
- Official website: reuters.tv

Reuters TV is a mobile video news service operated by the news organization Reuters. The service was available via several digital media players as well as the Reuters and Reuters TV apps and the Reuters TV website. On Wednesday, January 15, 2020, Reuters removed their channel from Roku and the Apple TV App store. Live feeds from the service had also been available via Livestation before Livestation was shut down.

Preparations for the service began in 2012 originally testing the concept on YouTube. The current service was announced in November 2014.

The service was launched in 2015 and promoted as "Netflix for News" and features “curated but personalized news coverage” via short video reports. The service offers two services: “Reuters Now”, a constantly-updated customisable, skippable and downloadable news lineup of lasting between 5 and 30 minutes composed of story clips, and uninterrupted live feeds of global events. Reuters TV has both a U.S. and international version of the service, with news tailored to both. The stories are chosen by user's interests, time and location (for example, an American viewer is likely to receive a longer report of an American-related news story than a French viewer.)

Originally costing 1.99 dollars a month, the service was made free in August 2015. In 2016, Reuters launched Reuters TV for publishers. In 2017, it was reported that Reuters TV had over 1 million viewers monthly, with users coming to the video service three times a week on average. On mobile devices, users spend an average of 12 minutes per session, while on streaming TV devices like Apple TV and Roku, the average time spent was 21 minutes per session when the service was available there.
