= Wang Wenjing =

- Born: 1964 (age 61–62); Shangrao, Jiangxi, China
- Education: Jiangxi University of Finance and Economics
- Occupations: Chairman, Yonyou
- Spouse: married
- Children: 1

Wang Wenjing (Chinese: 王文京; born 1964) is a Chinese billionaire businessman, chairman of Yonyou, a Chinese company specialising in accounting software and ERP software.

He was born in Shangrao, Jiangxi, China, the son of a poor farmer. An excellent student, he won a place at Jiangxi University of Finance and Economics aged 15.

On graduation, he was given a job in Beijing to "develop computerized financial software for the State Council's government offices administration". Aged 24, he resigned and with some classmates started UFSoft with $5500 that they pooled.

As of October 2015, Forbes estimated his net worth at US$2.7 billion.
