= Hefei Meiling =

Chinese home appliance manufacturer

Changhong Meiling Co., Ltd.
- Type: Public
- Traded as: SZSE: 000521
- Industry: Electronics
- Founded: 1992; 34 years ago
- Headquarters: Hefei, China
- Area served: China
- Website: meiling.com

Hefei Meiling is a Chinese home appliance manufacturer which is based in Hefei, China. It is the eighth largest home appliance manufacturer in China with an annual revenue around $1.71 billion in 2013. It was founded in 1992.

On July 3, 2018, the company's full name was changed from "Hefei Meiling Co., Ltd." to "Changhong Meiling Co., Ltd.", the company's A-share securities abbreviation was changed from "Meiling Electric" to "Changhong Meiling", and the company's B-share securities abbreviation was changed. Changed from "Wanmeiling B" to "Hongmeiling B".

On July 20, 2020, Hefei Meiling was added to the Entity List by the United States Department of Commerce.
