= Red Swoosh =

Peer-to-peer file sharing company

- Industry: Peer-to-peer file sharing
- Founded: 2001; 25 years ago
- Founder: Michael Todd; Travis Kalanick
- Defunct: April 12, 2007
- Fate: Acquired by Akamai Technologies

Red Swoosh was a peer-to-peer file sharing company founded by Travis Kalanick and Michael Todd in 2001. It was acquired by Akamai in 2007 for $19 million.

== History ==
Red Swoosh was founded by Travis Kalanick and Michael Todd in 2001.

The company suffered as a result of the early 2000s recession and was recapitalized in 2005, raising an additional $1.7 million from Mark Cuban.

=== Acquisition ===
On April 12, 2007, Akamai Technologies acquired Red Swoosh for $18.7 million in a stock-for-stock transaction.

== Description ==
Red Swoosh used a BitTorrent-like technology to transfer files using peer-to-peer technology.

The Red Swoosh technology included a centralized directory that indexed online clients and caches. The software downloads and sideloads video multicasts from websites that support the Red Swoosh technology. The Red Swoosh peercasting tool is a browser extension that caches data, reflecting and sharing files delivered through the "Swoosh network" or Distributed Network.

Red Swoosh utilizes a proprietary, peer-to-peer (P2P) file distribution protocol designed for bandwidth efficiency in the transfer of large media files.

The company offers a software development kit (SDK) for third-party development. This includes support for predelivery, RSS feeds, web widgets, and JavaScript applications. There is also a forum and a wiki available for the developer community.

== See also ==
- P2PTV
- Pando, a similar peer-to-peer sharing app
