= Yonyou =

Enterprise management software company

Yonyou Network Technology Co., Ltd.
- Company type: Public
- Traded as: SSE: 600588
- Industry: Information technology
- Founded: 1988
- Headquarters: Beijing, China
- Key people: Wang Wenjing; (Chairman)
- Products: Software
- Revenue: CN¥8,931.8 million (FY 2021)
- Total assets: CN¥17,329.34 million (31 December 2021)
- Total equity: CN¥6,987.46 million (31 December 2021)
- Number of employees: 21000
- Website: intl.yonyou.com

Yonyou (officially Yonyou Network Technology Co., Ltd., formerly yonyou Software Co., Ltd.) is a Chinese company, principally engaged in the development and distribution of enterprise management software and cloud services.

Yonyou has around 230 branches worldwide, including mainland China, Malaysia, Singapore, Macau, Hong Kong, Taiwan, Thailand and Indonesia.

== History ==
The company was founded in 1988.

In January 2024, founder Wang Wenjing stepped down as president of Yonyou while remaining chairman and chief executive officer. Veteran company executive Chen Qiangbin succeeded him as president. In January 2025, Yonyou appointed former SAP executive Huang Chenhong as president of the company.

== Products ==
Yonyou provides enterprise cloud services and management software enterprise resource planning (ERP) including Supply Chain Management (SCM), Customer Relationship Management (CRM), Human Resources (HR), business intelligence (BI), Office Automation (OA), Financial Management (FMS), etc. It also offers industry-wide solutions for retail, education, F&B, finance, construction, public organization and so on.

== Market share ==
Annual market reports from independent research firms, IDC and CCID Consulting, ranked Yonyou as China's No. 1 management solution provider over a period of five years.

Yonyou Network Technology announced its financial results for 2021. Gross revenue amounted to RMB 8.932 billion (US$1.404 billion). Revenue from cloud services (excluding financial cloud services) amounted to RMB 5.321 billion (US$836 million), up 55.5% year-on-year.

== See also ==
- Software industry in China
- China Software Industry Association
