= VanceInfo =

IT Outsourcing Company based in Beijing, China

VanceInfo Technologies Inc.
- Type: Public
- Industry: Information technology
- Founded: 1995
- Headquarters: Beijing, China
- Key people: Chris Chen (CEO and founder)
- Revenue: US$283.14 million (2011)
- Operating income: US$20.86 million (2011)
- Net income: US$22.19 million (2011)
- Total equity: US$303.44 million (at 31 December 2011)
- Number of employees: 14,111 (at 31 March 2012)
- Website: vanceinfo.com

VanceInfo (officially VanceInfo Technologies Inc., formerly known as Worksoft) is an IT outsourcing company headquartered in Beijing, China. It ranks first among Chinese offshore software development service providers for the North American and European markets as measured by 2010 revenues. The service areas of the company are in tech, telecom, finance, travel, manufacturing, retail and logistics.

In November 2012, the company merged with China-based IT outsourcing industry peer HiSoft to form Pactera.

== History ==
The company was founded in 1995 as Worksoft and started its long-term relationship with IBM. The company added an office in Dalian in 2004, and in that same year signed a contract with Unicom-BREW and built the PeopleSoft China Development Center.

In the next year important achievements included the building of the TIBCO China Development Center and selection as a Microsoft Preferred Vendor and built its China Offshore Development Centers in Shanghai and Beijing. In the same year, the company expanded by acquiring SureKAM and the US-based Siebel consultancy Envisys, and secured financing from funding by Hao Chen, Legend Capital and Rob Theis, Doll Capital Management (DCM).

More venture capital funding followed in 2006 from Kui Zhou and Doug Leone of Sequoia Capital. The company also in 2006 acquired China-based Prosoft Technology.

In 2007 the company changed its name to VanceInfo and went public on the NYSE, and opened offices in the US in Seattle, Washington and New York.

The company emerged in the backdrop of partisan political bickering in the US state of Ohio in 2010–2011. A group of state representatives allied with Service Employees International Union District 1199, a branch of a major trade union, pointed out that Mark Kvamme, a political appointee put in charge of creating jobs in Ohio, was a partner in Sequoia Capital, which had invested in VanceInfo. The state representatives and union branded Kvamme as unfit for the role of creating jobs in the state since he was tied to VanceInfo, an outsourcing company, through his stake in Sequoia Capital

In 2011, VanceInfo expanded into Australia, securing contracts with the Victorian Government, and Telstra, the country's largest telco.

== See also ==
- Software industry in China
- China Software Industry Association
