= BearingPoint =

Multinational management and technology consulting firm company

BearingPoint Europe Holdings B.V.
- Trade name: BearingPoint
- Type: Partnership
- Industry: Professional services, Management consulting, Technology services
- Predecessor: KPMG Consulting (1997-2002)
- Founded: November 1997 (as a business unit of KPMG); January 2000 (KPMG Consulting, LLC); October 2002 (BearingPoint Inc.); August 2009 (BearingPoint Europe Holdings B.V.)
- Headquarters: Amsterdam, Netherlands
- Number of locations: 56 offices in 26 countries
- Key people: Matthias Loebich (Managing Partner)
- Revenue: €1.025 billion (2025)
- Number of employees: 6,215 (2025)
- Website: www.bearingpoint.com

BearingPoint (parent company: BearingPoint Europe Holdings B.V.) is a multinational management and technology consulting firm headquartered in Amsterdam, Netherlands. It has operations in 26 countries with more than 6,200 employees.

The firm originated from the consulting services operations of KPMG; they became a distinct business unit in 1997, and demerged entirely in 2000. After an IPO in 2001, the company was renamed BearingPoint Inc. in October 2002.

In February 2009 the company's US unit filed for Chapter 11 bankruptcy. Parts of the business were sold to Deloitte, PwC, CSC, and Perot Systems. Following restructuring and a management buyout in August 2009, BearingPoint's continuing operations were organized as a Netherlands-based partnership.

== History ==
=== November 1997 to October 2002 (KPMG Consulting) ===
BearingPoint's origins lie in the consulting services operations of KPMG, which were established as a distinct business unit in 1997. KPMG had been providing consulting services to clients since its first contract with the US Navy prior to World War I. On 31 January 2000, KPMG formally spun off the consulting unit as KPMG Consulting, LLC. On 8 February 2001, the company went public on the NASDAQ market at $18 a share under the ticker "KCIN."

Over the next year and a half, the company acquired some of KPMG's country consulting practices, plus country practices and hiring from Arthur Andersen’s business consulting unit.

=== October 2002 to August 2009 (BearingPoint Inc.) ===
On 2 October 2002, the company was re-named BearingPoint and the next day began trading on the New York Stock Exchange under the ticker "BE."

After the 2003 invasion of Iraq, the company acquired a $9 million contract to outline and implement new economic regulations and institutions for the country, heavily focusing on neoliberal policies such as large-scale privatizations. According to a report by Stephen Foley, "BearingPoint employees gave $117,000 (£60,000) to the 2000 and 2004 Bush election campaigns, more than any other Iraq contractor."

BearingPoint was late in filing its financial reports through 2007. The Company said its net loss for the first quarter ended 31 March 2007 narrowed as revenue grew and costs declined. The company recorded a net loss of $61.7 million, or 29 cents per share for the first quarter, compared with a loss of $72.7 million, or 34 cents per share, in the same period a year earlier. The company recorded a net loss of $64.0 million, or 30 cents per share for the second quarter, compared with a loss of $2.85 million, or 1 cent per share, in the same period a year earlier. BearingPoint's shareholders' deficit was $365 million as of the close of the second quarter 2007 with a total accumulated deficit of $1.9 billion. On 11 August 2008, the company reported its first net income in three years and, as of the third quarter of 2008, had reported operating income for three consecutive quarters. During the third quarter of 2008, BearingPoint said its net loss was $30.5 million or $0.14 a share, an improvement of $37.5 million compared to the third quarter of 2007. BearingPoint's shareholders' deficit was $469.2 million as of the close of the third quarter 2008.

BearingPoint had difficulties with several major clients, including an outsourcing arrangement with Hawaiian Telcom. On 7 February 2007, BearingPoint announced that it had reached a settlement with Hawaiian Telcom due to issues with an IT system contract, paying the Hawaii telco $52 million and erasing an additional $30 million in previously submitted invoices. In exchange, Hawaiian Telcom released BearingPoint from any further liability. A day later, Hawaiian Telcom announced that it had signed a contract with Accenture to take over BearingPoint's role in their systems development.

On 10 December 2008, BearingPoint filed a Certificate of Amendment to the Certificate of Incorporation of the company with the Secretary of State of the State of Delaware to effect a previously approved reverse stock split of the company's outstanding common stock, par value $0.01 per share, at a ratio of one-for-fifty. The reverse stock split became effective at 6:01 p.m., Eastern Time, on 10 December 2008, at which time every fifty shares of Common Stock that were issued and outstanding automatically combined into one issued and outstanding share of Common Stock. On 13 November 2008, BearingPoint received notice from NYSE Regulation, Inc. (NYSE) that the NYSE had decided to suspend BearingPoint's common stock from trading prior to the market opening on 17 November 2008.

The company filed for Chapter 11 in the U.S. Bankruptcy Court in the Southern District of New York on 18 February 2009, with $2.23 billion in total debt and $1.76 billion in total assets as of 30 September. The filing included only the company's U.S. operations. Unable to sustain the heavy debt load resulting from ill-advised expansion moves, costly management errors and audit fees associated with the bankruptcy process, the company negotiated debt for equity swaps with its creditors and zeroed the value of its common shares, wiping out existing investors.

By May 2009, the company's Japan business unit and North American Commercial Services practice had been sold to PwC and its North American Public Services practice had been sold to Deloitte. Its Brazil unit was sold to CSC in July 2009 and its China unit was sold to Perot Systems in October of the same year.

=== August 2009 to present (BearingPoint partnership) ===
In 2009, 123 European executives bought-out BearingPoint's EMEA operations for $69 million and carried on the BearingPoint name as a newly-formed partnership. It made 13 acquisitions from 2018 to early 2024 and opened new offices abroad in India, the United States, and China.

In Australia, BearingPoint completed a local management buy-out in September 2009. The China-based information technology company HiSoft acquired BearingPoint Australia for an undisclosed sum in July 2012.

The European BearingPoint partnership has grown its revenues since becoming independent, from €441 million (2009) to €1.017 billion (2024). It now has offices in 19 European countries, outside EMEA the firm has offices in Asia and the US, as part of its strategy of expanding its reach across the G-20 countries and globally. To this end, BearingPoint also formed strategic alliances with West Monroe Partners in North America, Grupo ASSA in South America and ABeam in Asia.

In 2024, BearingPoint completed about 1,800 projects in 32 countries that year. However, the company's largest market is in Germany, where it is the sixth largest consultancy in the country. In 2025 and in 2026, BearingPoint was listed among TIME World’s Best Companies and Forbes World’s Best Employers.

== Services ==
The modern BearingPoint partnership was formed after a 2009 bankruptcy of its predecessor, BearingPoint Inc., which used to be one of the world's largest business and IT consulting firms. BearingPoint was initially known for purchasing and installing IT equipment. Over time, it developed more of a focus on professional services and consulting for large institutions.

BearingPoint provides management and IT consulting services under four lines of business: Business Transformation, Enterprise SAP Transformation, Enterprise Microsoft Transformation, and Products. In addition to its core consulting operations, BearingPoint runs two joint ventures: Arcwide, its joint venture with IFS, specializes in business transformation enabled by IFS technology. BearingPoint North America, its joint venture with ABeam Consulting, focuses on consulting and business transformation built on SAP. BearingPoint works in areas like streamlining business processes and IT security, largely for big companies and governments.
