= Changhong =

Chinese electronics company

Sichuan Changhong Electric Co., Ltd.
- Changhong (domestic) logo

- ChiQ (international) logo
- Trade name: Changhong; CHiQ
- Native name: 四川长虹电器股份有限公司
- Type: Public
- Traded as: SSE: 600839
- Industry: Electronics
- Founded: October 1958; 68 years ago
- Headquarters: Mianyang, China
- Area served: Worldwide
- Key people: Zhao Yong 赵勇 (President); Wang Fengzhao 王凤朝 (Vice Chairman, General Manager); Liu Tibing 刘体斌 (Vice Chairman, Deputy General Manager); Tan Mingxian 谭明献 (Secretary, Board of Directors, Deputy General Manager)
- Revenue: ▲108.2 billion CNY (September 2025)
- Operating income: ▲1.8 billion CNY (September 2025)
- Number of employees: 45,376 (2024)
- Website: cn.changhong.com chiq.com

Sichuan Changhong Electric Co., Ltd., doing business as Changhong (长虹) domestically and CHiQ internationally, is a Chinese consumer electronics company based in Mianyang, Sichuan, founded in October 1958. In 2004, 90 percent of the television sets exported from China to the United States were made by Changhong. It was the second-largest manufacturer of televisions in China as of 2010. In 2024, Changhong ranked 283rd on World Brand Lab's "World's 500 Most Influential Brand's" list.

Changhong makes televisions, white goods such as refrigerators and air conditioners, as well as projectors and DVD players, electronic components and batteries. Changhong has also released some mobile phone models.

== History ==
=== 1950–1999 ===
Changhong emerged from the Changhong Machinery Factory, which was a state-owned large enterprise established in the 1950s. The company, which was part of the 156 key projects that were aided by the Soviet Union, focused on the development and production of airborne fire control radar system.

Changhong Electronics developed during the Third Front campaign to develop basic industry and national defense industry in China's interior in case of invasion by the Soviet Union or United States. Changong Electronics is the best-known electronics manufacturer to arise during the Third Front period.

By the mid-1970s, Changhong began manufacturing products for civilian use when demand for military hardware declined, eventually focusing on the television product line. During the next decade, it beefed up its technological capabilities with a series of partnerships with overseas companies such as Panasonic, from which it imported tubes and advanced production lines to drive the volume production of television. It was a major driver in the regional share of television production in inland China rising from 0 to 32% of national production. In 1980, the company already boasted the production of over 10,000 television units annually and by 1988, this number rose to almost a million units. In 1994, the company was listed as a publicly traded company and, a year later, it was recognized as China's largest television manufacturer.

=== 2000–present ===
In 2001, Changhong reached an agreement with David Ji, the chairman of the American company Apex Digital. Changhong was at that point China's largest television manufacturer, a supplier majority-owned by the company-town city of Mianyang and the province of Sichuan. The company provided two-thirds of the city of Mianyang's revenue, and Changhong's chairman and managing director Zhao Yong was until late 2004 the city's deputy mayor. Changhong became Apex's largest supplier of DVD players.

On October 23, 2004, as Apex was in a business dispute with Changhong in which the two companies argued over hundreds of millions of dollars, as Ji was in China on a business trip he was arrested by Mianyang police in his hotel room in Shenzhen, China, near Hong Kong, who came from 500 miles away from Shenzhen. Changhong accused Ji of defrauding them through bad checks. He was held in China by Changhong for months without charges. On May 28, 2005, Ji was formally arrested on charges of "financial instrument fraud." In police custody, his conditions improved. In June 2005, Apex acknowledged a $150 million debt, but the debt remained unpaid as Apex said it did not have any money. In August 2005, the police released Ji on restricted bail, without him being indicted.

Since 2004, Changhong's development strategy and operating mechanism system have changed from time to time, and the industrial scale has expanded rapidly, becoming the leading enterprise in the domestic intelligent integration industry layout. It owns four listed companies including Sichuan Changhong, Changhong Meiling, Changhong Huayi and Changhong Jiahua. Changhong has a minimal presence in North America, where as of 2021 it sold TVs through the online retailer Newegg. It markets its brand CHIQ in the United States. Another line of products is the manufacturing of nickel–iron batteries.

== Leadership ==
Presidents of Changhong	Year
Ma Zhang	1957–1961
Shi Fu	1962–1964
Wang Zhidong	1966–1974
Kang Naide	1975–1980
Hu Zhengxing	1981–1982
Wang Jincheng	1983–1984
Ni Runfeng	1985–2004
Zhao Yong	2004–2023
Liu Jiang	2023–present
