= Asianux =

Linux distribution

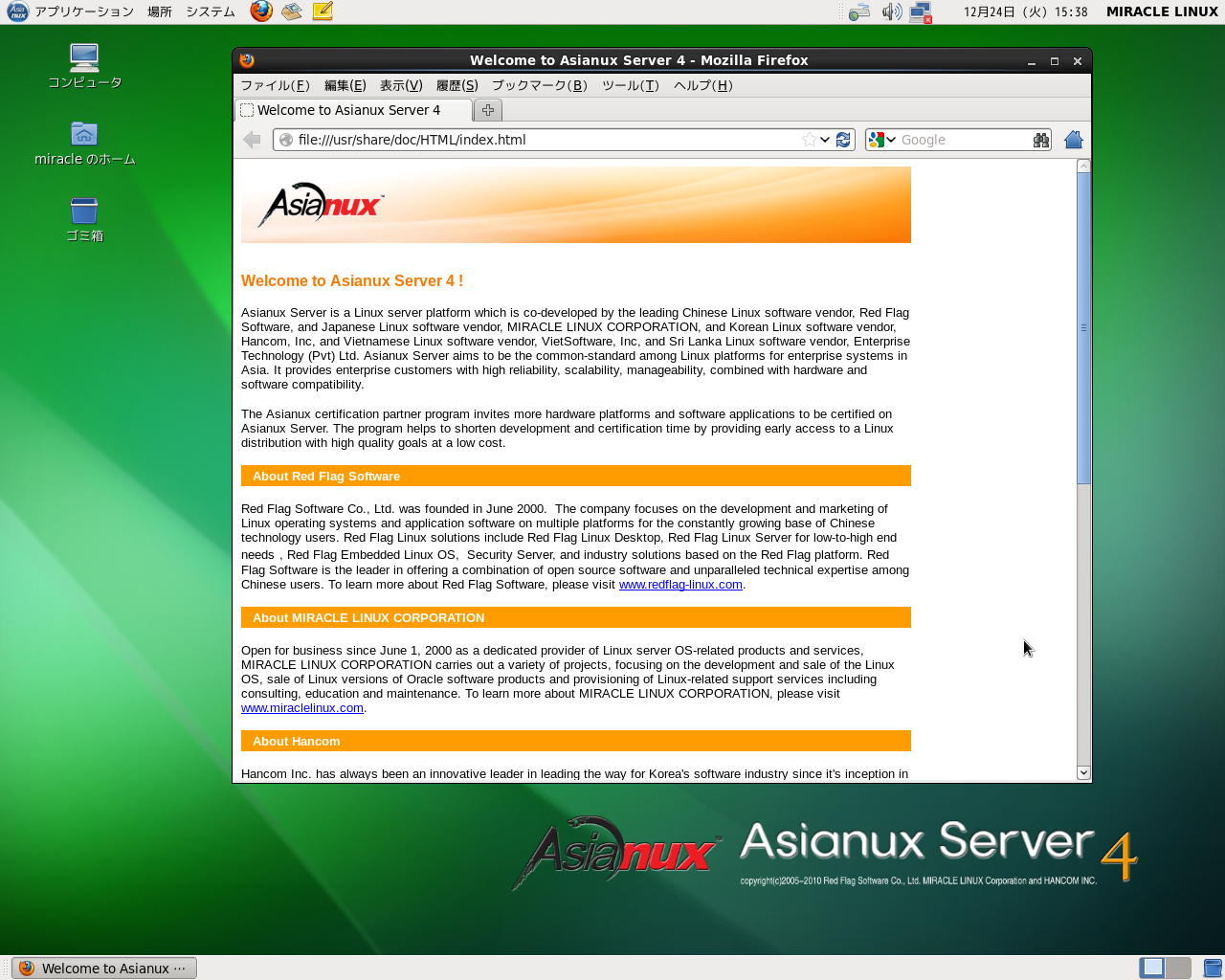
- Asianux 4.0
- OS family: Linux (Unix-like)
- Final release: 4.0 / January 17, 2012; 14 years ago
- License: Various
- Official website: Asianux website

Asianux was a Linux distribution based on Red Hat Enterprise Linux (RHEL) and jointly developed by companies in Japan, China, South Korea, Vietnam, Thailand and Sri Lanka. This project was dissolved in September 2015. The Asianux trademark is held by companies in each country.

== History ==
In December 2003, the Asianux project was initially started by two companies, Miracle Linux (Japan) and Red Flag Software (China). HanSoft (Korea) joined the project in October 2004 and the development was started by these three companies. Asianux Co. was established in December 2007 and VietSoftware (Vietnam), WTEC (Thailand) and Enterprise Technology (Sri Lanka) also participated in the Asianux project. The product name was unified worldwide under the name "Asianux" and sold in each country. Then, the Asianux project was disbanded in September 2015.

== Participated company ==
- Japan – Miracle Linux Co., (CyberTrust Japan Co.ltd.)
- China – Red Flag Software Co., Ltd.
- South Korea – Hancom
- Vietnam – VietSoftware, Inc.
- Thailand – WTEC Co., Ltd.
- Sri Lanka – Enterprise Technology Co., Ltd.

== Release history ==
- June 30, 2004 – Asianux 1.0
- August 26, 2005 – Asianux 2.0
- September 18, 2007 – Asianux Server 3
- January 17, 2012 – Asianux Server 4
