= Electronics industry in China =

The electronics industry in the People's Republic of China grew rapidly after the reform and opening up under the national strategic policy of accelerating the "informatization" of its industrial development. Subsequently, labour costs have risen and creating wealth for citizens. The industry has been a major contribution to the modernization of China and the development of new job opportunities. There are many instances of labour exploitation and subpar working conditions.

In 2005, China's electronic information sector made up 16.6% of the country's economic growth and its added-value output formed 7% of the GDP. Manufacturing was the sector that grew the fastest.

As of 2011, China is the world's largest market for personal computers.

Major Chinese electronics companies include BOE, Changhong, DJI, Haier, Hisense, Huawei, Konka, Lenovo (Hong Kong–based), Meizu, Oppo, Panda Electronics, Skyworth, SVA, TCL, Vivo, Xiaomi and ZTE.

China's production recorded the largest world market share for its electronics exports in 2016. It also recorded high volume outputs across a wide spectrum of consumer electronics; between 2014 and 2015—according to China Daily—286.2 million personal computers (90.6% of the global supply), 1.77 billion phones (70.6% of global supply of smartphones) and 109 million units (80% of global supply of air conditioners) were produced.

== Overview ==
China's electronic information industry has grown three times faster than the national GDP growth rate and has grown faster than the machinery manufacturing and metallurgy industries.

In 2005, total sales in the electronic information industry increased by 28.4% from 2004 to CN¥3.8 trillion (approximately US$475 billion).

The added-value base of the Chinese electronic information industry is about 900 billion yuan (approximately US$112 billion). The value added ratio is (amount of value added ÷ total sales x 100%) only 23.4%, compared to the whole national average of 27.1%.

This is evidence for China's role as an assembly base that is dependent upon overseas components and parts, intermediary goods, and capital goods.

The number of electronic information industry-related companies in China jumped from 7,500 in 2001, to 17,600 in 2003 and 67,000 in 2005, with approximately 56,000 of these being manufacturing companies. The number of employees engaged in the industry grew from 3.01 million in 2001 to 4.08 million in 2003 and 7.61 million in 2005 (out of whom 5.51 million are employed in the manufacturing industry).

== Development ==
China began a formal computing development program in 1956 when it launched the Twelve-Year Science Plan and formed the Beijing Institute of Computing Technology under the Chinese Academy of Sciences (CAS). In 1958, China produced its first vacuum-tube computer. Over the next several years, Chinese researchers expanded on these efforts with extrapolation from Soviet models.

Following the Sino-Soviet split, China continued to develop domestic computing and electronic institutions, including the Beijing Institute of Electronics in 1963.

In 1964, CAS debuted China's first self-developed large digital computer, the 119. The 119 was a core technology in facilitating China's first successful nuclear weapon test (Project 596), also in 1964.

In 1966, China transitioned from vacuum-tube computers to fully transistorized computers. In the mid-1960s through the late 1960s, China began a semiconductor program and was producing third-generation computers by 1972.

In the 1960s, Chen Boda advocated the strategy of "electrocentrism", through which the electronics industry should develop technological advancements and become embedded at all levels of China's economy. This included small-scale enterprises (not just large enterprises) producing electronics and that China could use the methods of a people's war to "smash electronic mysticism" and rapidly develop in the age of electronics. This emphasis on local production of electronics included areas with no meaningful previous electronics production like Tibet, Qinghai, and Ningxia. Local efforts included the production of electronic components in women-run factories and former textile mills. By 1968, the total output of local electronics enterprises had exceeded the output of centrally-managed enterprises.

Electronics manufacturing expanded during the Third Front industrial development campaign and by 1980, inland China accounted for more than half of the country's electronics production capacity and work force. Major production facilities were built in Sichuan, Shaanxi, and Guizhou, with the most widely known electronics factory being Changhong Electric in Mianyang, Sichuan. From 1969 to 1970, China increased its number of electronics factories by 2.5 times. This was more than twenty times the number of electronics factories China had in 1965.

Arcade video games were introduced into China in the 1980s. Video game consoles were introduced to China in the late 1980s and were primarily imported form Japan. Xiaobawang Company created the first Chinese-produced console; it came with a keyboard and was intended both for gaming and educational purposes.

Home ownership of computers in urban China increased significantly after 1995.

== Foreign firms ==
Foreign investment and overseas investments in China's manufacturing industry shows that foreign investment has been decreasing year by year, It shows that China's manufacturing industry has become less attractive. In contrast, foreign investment has been increasing year by year that shows China's manufacturing industry is getting closer and closer to foreign countries.

== See also ==
- Semiconductor industry in China
- Telecommunications industry in China
- Software industry in China
- Economy of China
- China Electronics Corporation
- China National Electronics Import & Export Corporation
