= Kingdee =

Hong Kong Stock Exchange main board listed company

Kingdee International Software Group Limited
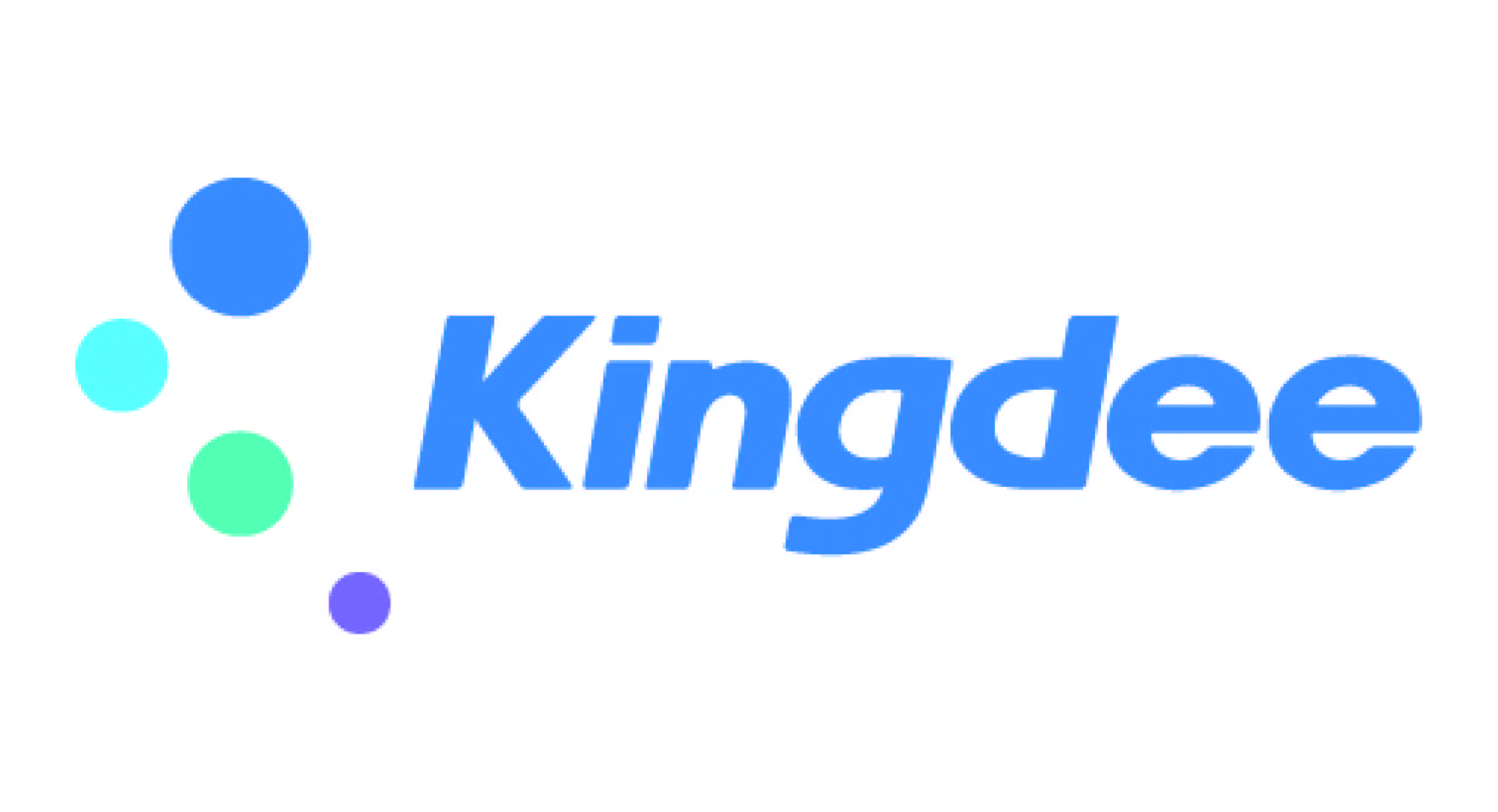

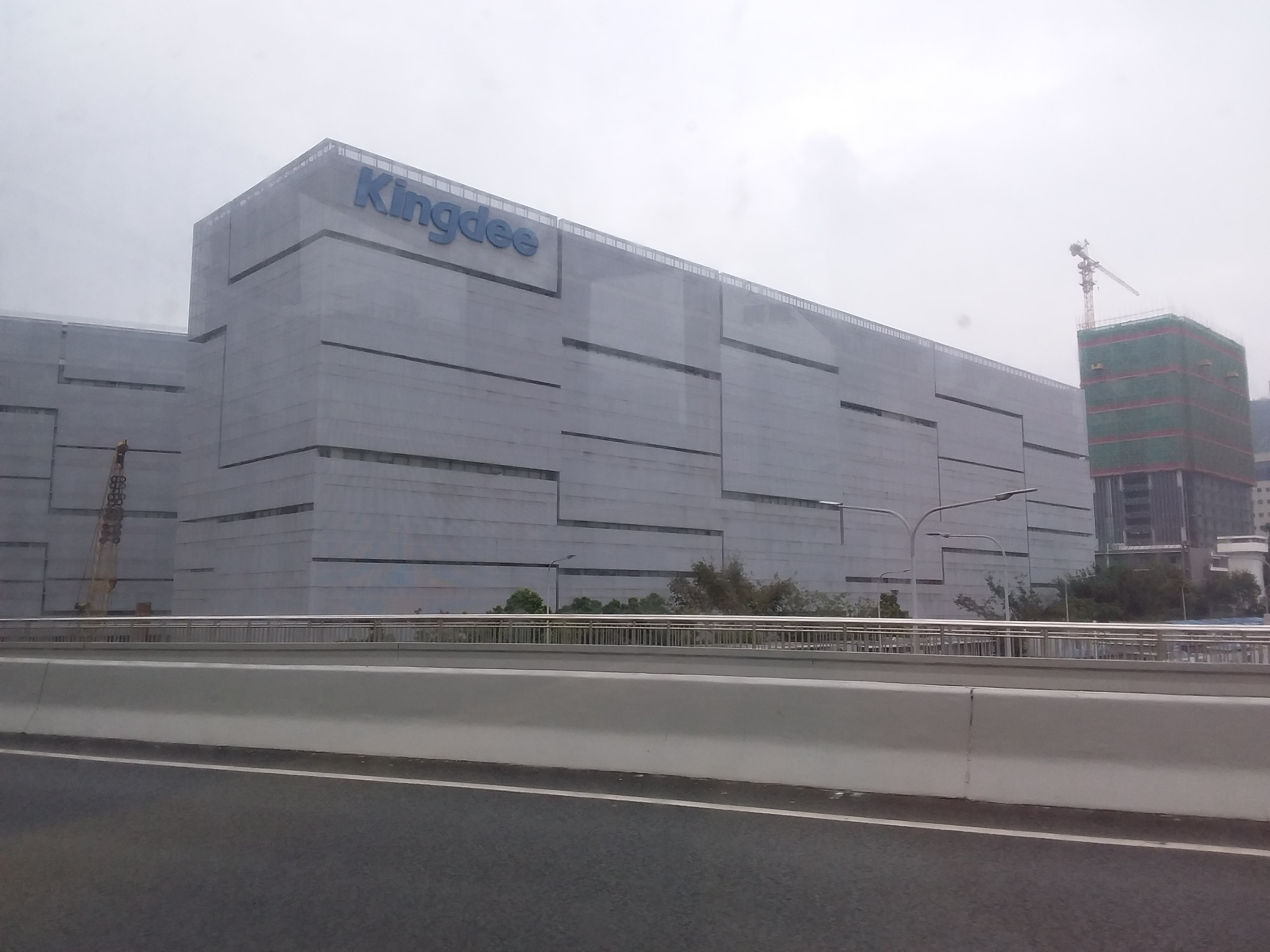
- Kingdee headquarters in Shenzhen in 2019
- Type: Public
- Traded as: SEHK: 268
- Industry: Software
- Founded: August 8, 1993; 33 years ago
- Founder: Xu Shaochun
- Headquarters: Shenzhen, China
- Key people: Xu Shaochun (Chairman & CEO)
- Products: Cloud computing, enterprise software
- Website: www.kingdee.com

Kingdee International Software Group is a Chinese cloud computing and software company based in Shenzhen. It is listed on the Hong Kong Stock Exchange main board and is leader in the Chinese software industry.

The company is a leading enterprise management software company in the Asia-Pacific region. It was founded on August 8, 1993 and produces enterprise resource planning (ERP) software and provides SaaS Enterprise Application Cloud Services.

== History ==
On 15 February 2001, Kingdee International was listed on the Hong Kong Stock Exchange GEM with stock code 8133.HK. On 20 July 2005, it transferred to Hong Kong Stock Exchange main board with stock code 0268.HK. In 2007, IBM and Lehman Brothers (bankrupted) invested and held 7.7% shares of Kingdee International. As one of the strategic shareholders of the group, Kingdee and IBM formed global strategic alliance and collaborated in the various markets and aspects such as SOA, marketing, consulting and application services, SaaS, cloud computing and e-commerce.

In August 2019, Kingdee was awarded the 2019 Amazon Web Services (AWS) Partner Network (APN) Best SaaS Partner Award at the AWS Partner Summit 2019.
