= PULSE (P2PTV) =

- Initial release: 2007
- Available in: English
- Type: P2PTV

PULSE is a P2PTV application developed by the European FP7 NAPA-WINE (Network-Aware P2P-TV Application over Wise Networks) research consortium.

PULSE stands for Peer-to-Peer Unstructured Live Streaming Experiment and is a peer-to-peer live streaming system designed to operate in scenarios where the bandwidth resources of nodes can be highly heterogeneous and variable over time, as is the case for the Internet.

== History ==
The principles and basic algorithms of PULSE were proposed by Fabio Pianese. The prototype was developed by Diego Perino and released with a LGPL Software License. The development has been taken over by the NAPA-WINE consortium in 2008, and version 0.2.2 can be downloaded via anonymous svn from the NAPA-WINE website.

== P2PMyLive ==
In 2009, PULSE introduced P2PMyLive, where content providers can announce their streaming. Either the source or the participant can use the same graphical front-end to the pulse engine, which is available for Windows and Linux Ubuntu. Live streaming can be performed without any restriction.

== See also ==
- P2PTV
- PeerStreamer (from NAPA-WINE too, first released in 2011).
