= QQLive =

Live streaming video software

- Original author: Tencent technology cooperation team
- Developer: Tencent
- Stable release: QQLive2010Beta2 / May 20, 2010
- Operating system: Win2k/XP/Vista/Win7
- Size: 6.47 MB
- Available in: Chinese
- Website: qql824.com live.qq.com v.qq.com/x/live/sport.html

QQlive is a live streaming video freeware created by Tencent, which takes advantages of advanced P2P streaming media technology to ensure that the platform can keep up with traffic. It attracts 3,000,000 visitors per day.

== Introduction ==
QQLive provides two modes to view that the user can select, community mode and player mode. Community mode integrates chatroom and forum, which can offer users a platform to discuss the program they are viewing and socialize. Player mode only offers video watching functionality. QQLive was also released for iPhone, Android Phone and iPad. QQLive for iPhone was released in 2011. Its newest version 3.7 has reached the first place in the free app charts of China Apple Store.

== Requirements ==
- CPU frequency of operation: Pentium III 800M
- Internal memory: 128M
- Windows 98 or later (Win2k/XP/Vista/Win7) is required.
- Support for Windows Media Player 9 or later.
- Be compatible with DirectX 8.0 or above. 800*600 and 1024*768 resolution is required.

== Lighten QQlive ==
After installation of QQlive, the software icon will be lightened if users log for five days constantly. But if user did not log in for fifteen days, the icon would extinguish.

== See also ==
- Soso.com
- Tencent QQ
- QQ Games
- QQdownload
- Qzone
