= Sunwah – PearL Linux =

Sunwah – PearL Linux (previously spelled as Sun Wah – PearL Linux, abbreviation SWP) is a joint venture of the Hong Kong Polytechnic University and the Sunwah Group (previously spelled as Sun Wah Group).

Sunwah – PearL Linux established the (SWP) Sunwah – PearL Linux Training & Development Centre on the university campus in January 2001. SWP promotes open source software (OSS) technology.

== Evolution ==
Since its incorporation, SWP has positioned itself as the open source technology transfer centre of its region. It developed skill transfer programs based on open source. In the early years, SWP's own developed programs were module by module based on specific applications for operating systems or programming languages. In 2005, SWP started to become more focussed on information security.

Besides short training programs, SWP started to work on Higher Education (HE) programs. SWP cooperated with the University of Glamorgan and the University of Sunderland in the United Kingdom, to offer programs in Hong Kong. SWP and the University of Glamorgan cooperate to offer postgraduate education in computer forensics, forensic accounting and information security. SWP and the University of Sunderland cooperate to offer BA (Hons) Top-up Graphic Design program in Hong Kong.

In the summer of 2009, SWP became an accredited centre of Edexcel and NCC Education. The accreditation lets SWP offer Foundation Studies and Higher National Diploma (HND) courses.

== Difficult times ==
- In 2003, SARS attacked the region and training activity stopped. Positioned as a skill transfer centre, the major revenue source is delivering skill transfer training classes. This put SWP in a financial crisis.
- Linux and OSS business has proven challenging. The revenue model was not based on grants, while pure Linux and OSS business might not generate enough revenue to keep SWP going. SWP had to rethink a way to survive, or its own generated funding would be ended by mid-2004.

== Skill transfer training courses ==
Since its establishment in January 2001, SWP has been working with the open source community on developing skill transfer training. SWP has developed courses on operating systems including Linux and BSD Unix, and on programming including PHP, Java, MySQL database, Ajax, XML, JavaScript, and Extreme programming.

== OSS events ==
SWP has conducted technical seminars on open source technology. Some open source leaders like Zeev Suraski, Jeremy Allison, Andrew Tridgell, Jon Hall, and others were guest speakers at its seminars.

SWP organized the first Software Freedom Day in Hong Kong in 2007.

== Community links ==
SWP has contributed to international and local open communities. Some of them include the International Information and Communication Technology Council Certification Program, The Hong Kong Linux User Group, The Opensource Application Knowledge Association, The Linux Professional Institute Certification Program, The Hong Kong Samba Association, and Software Freedom Day.

== The team ==
Board of Directors:

- Dr. Lui Sun Wing
- Professor Jonathan Choi
- Mr. Andrew Young
- Mr. Alwin Wong
- Professor Keith Chan
- Mr. Alex Banh
- Mr. Daniel Lee
- Mr. Albert Chung

Many members of the operational team come from the local OSS community. They contribute columns, articles and publication at local IT or OSS related magazines.

== History ==
At one time there were three Hong Kong based Debian developers and a local community members being employed at the Sunwah Group. The Group has developed a special Linux distribution called Sunwah Linux (rays Linux Distribution), which is a Linux desktop distribution that addresses the Chinese localization need, i.e. the handling and translation between the Unicode, Big5, and various versions of GB character encodings. Members of the group represented China at international events, namely North-East Asia OSS Promotion Forum and Asian Open Source Software Symposium.

The Sunwah Linux (rays Linux Distribution) won the Best Linux Desktop Application at the 2006 LinuxWorld Conference and Expo, Boston.
