= UniHan IME =

UniHan IME is an input method based on the framework of IIIMF developed by Hong Kong Sun Wah Hi-Tech Ltd.. UniHan IME is an input method interface that maps the keyboard keys string to the Han character in the latest version of Unicode Table.

UniHan is the CJKV characters section which occupied more than half the storage space of the Unicode Table. There are more than 75,000 characters coded in version 6.0.0 in year 2010. The Chinese, Japanese, Korean and Vietnamese shared the Han characters for naming for more than thousand years. The input methods for the Han characters from Unicode are mainly keyboard typing, mouse pointing on screen or hand writing on pad. The popular methods are the pinyin keyboard method and the hand writing method. A complete font set for Unihan version 6.0.0 is yet to come and so is the Unihan IME.

A similar IME called 8 Steps Unihan was developed by 8 Steps Unihan company in Melbourne, Australia. The 8StepsA font coupled with Microsoft windows 10 SimSunExtB font are able to display all the characters in Unihan 10.0. which includes the extension F character set. The glyphs that are repeated have been linked together and only one of the linked code is used by the IME so that all the displayable characters are unique.
