= Sunwah Linux =

Chinese Linux distribution

RAYS Linux
- OS family: Linux (Unix-like)
- Working state: Defunct
- Latest release: 2.0 / October 2007
- Available in: Chinese
- Kernel type: Monolithic (Linux kernel)
- Official website: www.sw-linux.com.cn

RAYS Linux (previously Sun Wah Linux) was a Chinese Debian-based Linux distribution.

== Development and distribution ==
Sunwah Linux was a Debian-based distribution. It was the first Chinese Linux distribution to receive Linux Standard Base (LSB) certification. The system architecture was designed in Hong Kong and the programming was developed in Nanjing. The distribution was sponsored by the Sunwah Group in Hong Kong and the Jiangsu Provincial Government of China.

Sunwah - PearL Linux (abbreviated SWP), the technology training entity of the group, has been providing research assistance, testing, and training support for the distribution. SWP is a joint establishment of the Hong Kong Polytechnic University and the Sunwah Group.

In 2005, Sunwah Linux was installed in over 140,000 PCs in primary and secondary schools in China.

== Awards ==
In April 2006, Sunwah Linux won the Best Linux Desktop Application Award at the LinuxWorld Conference and Expo in Boston. According to Albert Chung, who presented the distribution to the judges, "The competition was fierce. We were proud of our Chinese Linux desktop distribution being recognized by industry experts and judges."

== See also ==
- Sunwah – PearL Linux
