= Rawflow =

Streaming technology company

RawFlow was a provider of live p2p streaming technology that enables internet broadcasting of audio and video. The company's technology is similar to Abacast and Octoshape.

Rawflow was incorporated in 2002 by Mikkel Dissing, Daniel Franklin and Stephen Dicks. Its main office was in London, UK. Velocix acquired RawFlow in July 2008. Alcatel-Lucent acquired Velocix in July 2009. The streaming media CDN solution by Alcatel-Lucent is called Velocix Digital Media Delivery Platform.

A peer-to-peer (or P2P) computer network relies on the computing power and bandwidth of the participants in the network rather than concentrating it in a relatively low number of servers. When using this technology, the bandwidth requirement of the broadcast is intelligently distributed over the entire network of participants, instead of being centralised at the broadcast's origin; as the audience grows so do the network resources available to distribute that broadcast without adding any additional bandwidth costs.

== How does it work? ==
The RawFlow ICD (Intelligent Content Distribution) Server provides the initial contact point for clients in the network. When initially installed, the ICD Server connects to the broadcaster's existing media server and begins receiving the stream, maintaining a buffer of stream data in memory at all times. It then begins accepting connections from clients and serving them with the stream. When launched by a user, the ICD Client first contacts the ICD Server and begins receiving the stream from it. The media player plays the stream as it is received by the ICD Client. If it has available resources, the ICD Client also accepts connections from other clients in the grid to which it may relay a portion or the whole stream it receives as requested.

The ICD Client monitors the quality of the stream it is receiving and upon any reduction of quality or loss of connection it again searches the grid for available resources while continuing to serve the media player from its buffer. The buffer prevents interruption to the playback and ensures that the end-user experience is not affected.

The ICD Server is always available as a last resort for clients that cannot find sufficient available resources in the grid. This guarantees a constant seed of the stream.
