= Ace Stream =

Peer-to-peer multimedia streaming protocol

- Repository: github.com/acestream/
- Type: peer-to-peer multimedia streaming protocol
- Website: acestream.org

Ace Stream is a peer-to-peer multimedia streaming protocol, built using BitTorrent technology. Ace Stream has been recognized by sources as a potential method for broadcasting and viewing bootlegged live video streams. The protocol functions as both a client and a server. When users stream a video feed using Ace Stream, they are simultaneously downloading from peers and uploading the same video to other peers.

== History ==
Ace Stream began under the name TorrentStream as a pilot project to use BitTorrent technology to stream live video. In 2013 TorrentStream, was re-released under the name ACE Stream.
