= Liu Jiren =

Chinese computer scientist

- 刘积仁
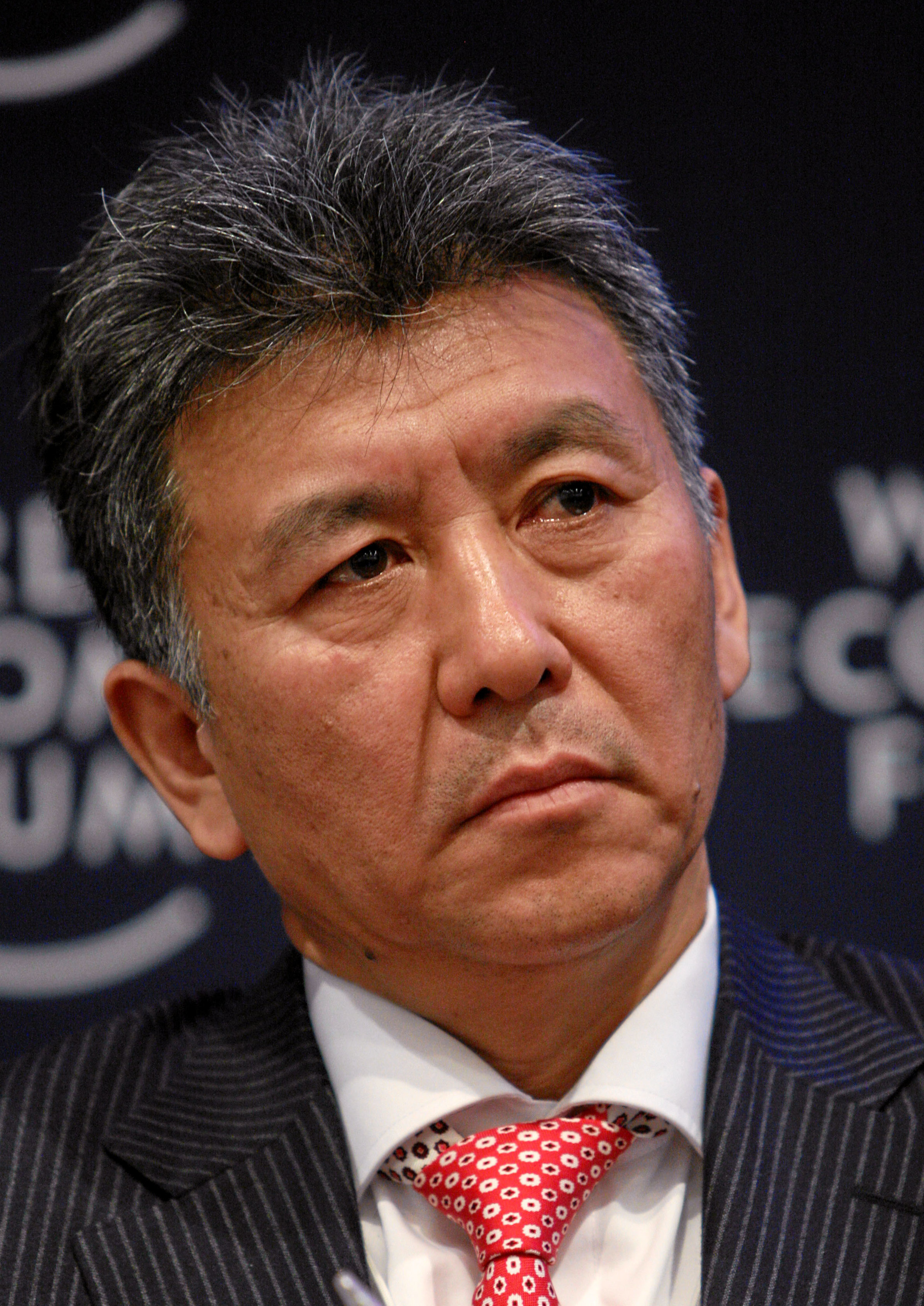
- Liu Jiren at the World Economic Forum annual meeting in 2011
- Born: August 1955 (age 69); Dandong, Liaoning, China
- Education: Northeastern University
- Occupations: Businessman; Computer scientist
- Known for: Chairman and CEO of Neusoft Group

Liu Jiren (Chinese: 刘积仁) is the chairman and CEO of Neusoft Group, a large software company in China.

In 2019, Dr. Liu received Ernst & Young's EY Entrepreneur Of The Year Alumni Award for Societal Impact.
