= PPS.tv =

Chinese peer-to-peer streaming video network software

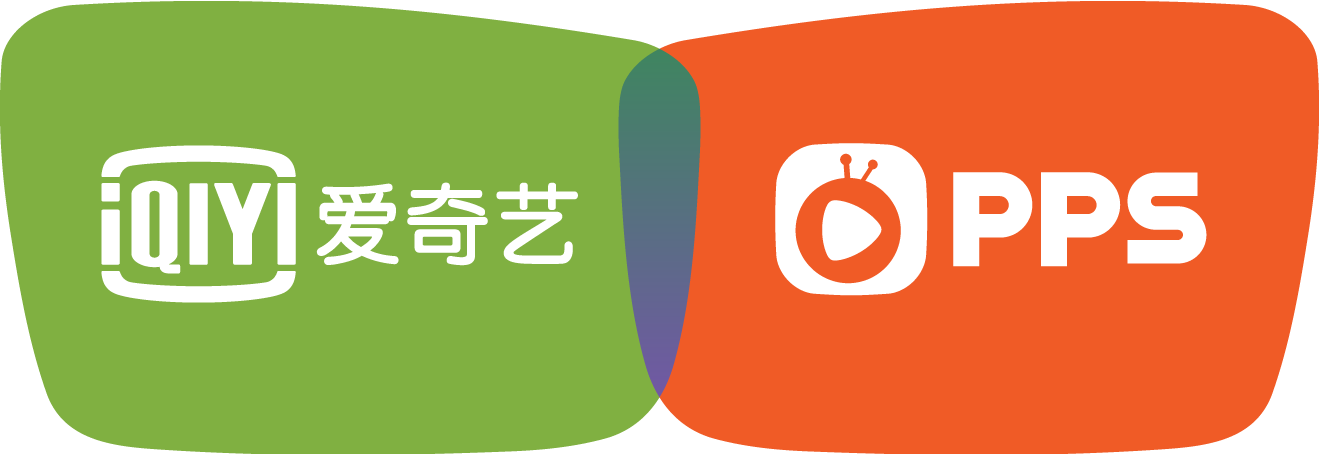

- Screenshot of PPS.tv homepage
- Developers: PPStream, Inc.
- Initial release: 1 June 2006
- Stable release: 3.8.22.2677 / 30 March 2015; 10 years ago
- Operating system: Windows, Mac OS X, Ubuntu, iOS, Android
- Platform: Peer-to-peer streaming Internet television
- Size: 28.9M
- Available in: Chinese
- Type: Run in peer-to-peer streaming media
- License: Freeware
- Website: Archived 2012-05-04 at the Wayback Machine

Suike, previously PPS.tv or PPStream, is a Chinese peer-to-peer streaming video network software. The vast majority of channels are from East Asia, mostly Mainland China, Japan, South Korea, Hong Kong, Taiwan, Malaysia, and Singapore. Programmes vary from Chinese movies to Japanese anime, sports channels, as well as popular American TV and films.

It had an 8.9% market share in China in Q3 2010, placing it third, behind Youku and Tudou. In May 2013, the online video business of PPS.tv was purchased by Baidu for $370 million. After the acquisition, PPS.tv continued to operate as a sub-brand under iQIYI, Baidu's online video platform.

== See also ==
- PPLive
