= Panda Electronics =

Chinese manufacturer

Nanjing Panda Electronics Co Ltd
- Type: Public
- Industry: Information technology Electronics
- Founded: 1936; 90 years ago
- Headquarters: Nanjing, China
- Products: Mobile phones, TV sets and others
- Revenue: US$5 billion (2007)
- Website: www.panda.cn

Panda Electronics is a Chinese manufacturer and brand for electronic products. The products include mobile phones, datacards, TV sets and set top boxes, administrative software, electronic instruments, satellite and mobile communication.

== History ==
Panda Group was originally a radio manufacturer established in 1936 under the Nationalist government. The company was moved to Taiwan during the Chinese Civil War and the remaining plant was re-established as Nanjing Wireless Electronics Plant and in 1995 renamed Panda Electronics Group. Nanjing Panda Electronics Co Ltd, controlled by the Panda Group, was listed on the Hong Kong and Shanghai stock exchanges in 1996. The company has links to the People's Liberation Army and also has a joint venture in North Korea in collaboration with the North Korean government.

=== U.S. sanctions ===
In November 2020, Donald Trump issued an executive order prohibiting any American company or individual from owning shares in companies that the United States Department of Defense has listed as having links to the People's Liberation Army, which included Panda Electronics.
