= TVU Networks Corporation =

American broadcast equipment manufacturer

- Type: Private
- Industry: Technology
- Founded: 2005
- Headquarters: Mountain View, California, United States
- Key people: Paul Shen, Chief Executive Officer
- Products: TVU Alert, TVU Anywhere, TVU AP ENPS Integration, TVU Aerial Newsgathering Pack, TVU Booking Service, TVU Command Center, TVU Era, TVU Grid, TVU Me, TVU MediaMind, TVU MLink, TVU One, TVU One TM1000G, TVU Producer, TVU Router, TVU Remote Production System, TVU Timelock, TVU Transcriber
- Website: www.tvunetworks.com

TVU Networks Corporation is a private technology company based in Mountain View, California. It develops hardware and software for live video transmission and broadcasting applications.

== History ==
In April 2010, the company released TVU Player, a live streaming viewer that enabled access to live television programming over broadband connections. The service was discontinued in 2013.

In September 2010, TVU introduced the TVU Pack TM8000, a backpack-style transmitter designed for live HD video transmission over the internet in low-bandwidth conditions. The product employed channel bonding to combine multiple network connections for signal reliability.

TVU later developed a mobile app for news gathering, compatible with iOS and Android devices, and introduced a cloud-based solution for point-to-multipoint live video distribution.

In 2013, Gray Television became the first national station group to implement TVU’s Grid platform.

In 2015, the company launched TVU One, a compact portable transmitter that succeeded earlier cellular video units. The new model was significantly smaller than its predecessor. That same year, TVU partnered with drone manufacturer DJI to support live aerial video transmission.

Beginning in 2020, the company increased its focus on cloud-native solutions to support the broadcasting industry's shift from SDI to IP-based workflows.

In July 2024, TVU announced a partnership with the BBC to support coverage of the 2024 UK general election. The collaboration delivered 369 live feeds to enhance election broadcasting across BBC platforms.
