= CCID Consulting =

Chinese consulting firm

CCID Consulting Co., Ltd. (SEHK: 8235) is China's largest research, consulting and IT outsourcing service company, and the first Chinese consulting firm listed in Hong Kong Stock Exchange.

== Location ==
CCID Consulting was the first Chinese consulting firm listed in the Growth Enterprise Market (GEM, Chinese: 創業板) of Hong Kong Stock Exchange, and is a direct affiliate to the China Center for Information Industry Development (CCID Group). Headquartered in Beijing, CCID Consulting has branch offices in Shanghai, Guangzhou, Shenzhen, Nanjing, Wuhan and Chengdu, with over 300 professional consultants.

== Business ==
The company's businesses cover over 200 large and medium-sized cities in China. Based on major areas of competitiveness: industrial resources, information technology and data channels, CCID Consulting provides customers with public policy establishment, industry competitiveness upgrade, development strategy and planning, marketing strategy and research, HR management, IT programming and management. Customers range from industrial users in electronics, semiconductors, telecommunications, energy, finance, automobile, to government departments at all levels and diversified industrial parks.
