= Software industry in China =

The software industry in China is the business of developing and publishing software and related services in China. The size of the industry including software and information services in 2013 was worth 3060 billion RMB (about $493 billion) according to the Ministry of Industry and Information Technology.

== Companies ==
Leaders in the enterprise software market are UFIDA Software, Kingdee, Neusoft and SAP.

== See also ==
- Business process outsourcing in China
- China Software Industry Association
- Dalian Software Park
- Institute of Software, Chinese Academy of Sciences
- Software companies of China
