= EY Entrepreneur of the Year Award =

EY competition and award for entrepreneurs

EY Entrepreneur Of The Year Award
- Awarded for: Entrepreneurship
- Sponsored by: EY
- Date: 1986
- Presented by: EY
- Website: ey.com/entrepreneur-of-the-year

EY Entrepreneur Of The Year, previously known as Ernst & Young Entrepreneur of the Year Awards, is an annual award program sponsored by EY in recognition of entrepreneurship. Founded in 1986 in Milwaukee as a single award, the program now runs in all 50 U.S. states and in more than 60 countries.

At the country and territory levels, programs begin with nomination of entrepreneurs who demonstrate specific criteria. The award may be given to multiple individuals per year. For example, in the U.S. and other countries, there are multiple regional and category winners, spanning fields such as for retail and consumer products, technology, family business, energy, chemical and mining, food products and services, real estate, hospitality, and construction, financial services, digital media, and transformational ventures. However, in each country, only one company and its leader(s) are recognized as the overall award recipient. EOY in national levels typically split into categories, for example in Ireland there is Emerging, Established, and International. One of those category winners will win overall and represent their region/nation/area in the World EOY.Many Regions also give out a sustainability award.The categories vary by location.Unique to Ireland is the “CEO retreat” where the office(and country) managing partners, sector leading partners, and senior(equity) partners take a foreign trip with the finalists, similar events include summits for the largest EY offices across the U.S.

Since 1986, over 10,000 founders, CEOs, and business leaders have received awards, with an average of 400 recipients annually.

== EY World Entrepreneur of the Year ==
Since 2001, the overall country winners from EY Entrepreneur of the Year programs around the world have gathered in Monte Carlo, Monaco the first week of every June for EY World Entrepreneur of the Year.

Dubbed "the ultimate global competition and event for entrepreneurs," each year's class of country winners are reviewed by an independent judging panel of business leaders and previous award recipients.

The judges for EY World Entrepreneur of the Year 2023 were Chair of Judges Hernan Kazah, Co-Founder and Managing Partner, Kaszek Ventures (Argentina); George Hongchoy, Executive Director and CEO, Link Asset Management Limited (Hong Kong and China); Phyllis Newhouse, CEO, Xtreme Solutions, Inc. (USA); Susan Chong, Founder and President, Greenpac Pte Ltd. (Singapore); Noëlla Coursaris Musunka, Founder and CEO, Malaika (Democratic Republic of the Congo); Michèle Sioen, CEO, Sioen Industries (Belgium); Rafał Brzoska, CEO, InPost Group (Poland); and JungJin SEO, Honorary Chairman, Celltrion Group (South Korea).

=== 21st century recipients ===
Year	Winner(s)	Company	Country
2001	Paolo della Porta	SAES Getters	Italy
2002	Stefan Vilsmeier	BrainLab	Germany
2003	Narayana Murthy	Infosys Technologies	India
2004	Tony Tan Caktiong	Jollibee Foods Corporation	Philippines
2005	Wayne Huizenga	Huizenga Holdings	United States
2006	Bill Lynch	Imperial Holdings	South Africa
2007	Guy Laliberté	Cirque du Soleil	Canada
2008	Jean-Paul Clozel	Actelion	Switzerland
2009	Cho Tak Wong	Fuyao Glass Industry Group	China
2010	Michael Spencer	ICAP	United Kingdom
2011	Olivia Lum	Hyflux Limited	Singapore
2012	James Mwangi	Equity Bank	Kenya
2013	Hamdi Ulukaya	Chobani	United States
2014	Uday Kotak	Kotak Mahindra Bank	India
2015	Mohed Altrad	Altrad	France
2016	Manny Stul	Moose Enterprise	Australia
2017	Murad Al-Katib	AGT Food and Ingredients	Canada
2018	Rubens Menin	MRV Engenharia	Brazil
2018	Aaron Begley	Matrix Composites & Engineering	Australia
2019	Brad Keywell	Uptake Technologies	United States
2020	Kiran Mazumdar-Shaw	Biocon	India
2021	Jung Jin Seo	Celltrion	South Korea
2022	Gaston Taratuta	Aleph Inc	Argentina
2023	Doris Hsu	GlobalWafers	Taiwan
2024	Vellayan Subbiah	Tube Investments of India & Cholamandalam Investment and Finance Co.	India
2025	Stina Ehrensvärd	Yubico	Sweden

== Other awards ==
Periodically, global leaders are bestowed awards during the EY World Entrepreneur Of The Year award gala in Monaco.

=== EY Entrepreneur of the Year Social Entrepreneurship Award ===
The EY Entrepreneur of the Year Social Impact and Social Entrepreneurship awards recognize the achievements of leaders whose legacies have had global impact in areas such as sustainability. This award is peer-selected by EOY alumni that form the Global Alumni Council. Recipients of this award are considered EOY alumni.

Year	Winner(s)	Company	Country	Announcement
2016	Selim Bassoul	Bassoul Dignity Foundation	Lebanon	
2018	Andrew Forrest	Fortescue	Australia	
2019	Liu Jiren	Neusoft	China	
2021	Charles III	Monarchy of the United Kingdom	United Kingdom	
2022	Stella McCartney	Stella McCartney Cares	United Kingdom	
2022	Al Hasan Milad	Social Organizations	Bangladesh	
