= Stina =

Stina is a feminine given name, common in the Nordic countries, and may refer to:

- Stina Aronson (1892–1956), Swedish writer
- Stina Berg (1869–1930), Swedish actress
- Stina Bergman (1888–1976), Swedish writer, translator, and screenwriter
- Stina Bergström (born 1958), Swedish politician
- Stina Blackstenius (born 1996), Swedish association football player
- Stina Lykke Borg (born 1986), Danish football goalkeeper
- Stina Lundberg Dabrowski (born 1950), Swedish journalist, television host, producer and writer
- Stina Cronholm (born 1936), Swedish hurdler and pentathlete
- Stina Ehrensvärd (born 1967), Swedish entrepreneur and industrial designer
- Stina Ekblad (born 1953), Swedish-speaking Finnish actress
- Stina Lovisa Estberg (born 1998), Swedish artistic gymnast
- Stina Gardell (born 1990), Swedish medley swimmer
- Stina Grenholm, Swedish ski-orienteer
- Stina Haage (1924–2017), Swedish gymnast
- Stina Hedberg (1887–1981), Swedish actress
- Stina Högkvist (born 1972), Swedish art curator and art historian
- Stina Karlsson (born 1961), Swedish cross-country skier
- Stina Leicht (born 1972), American science fiction and fantasy author
- Stina Lennartsson (born 1997), Swedish footballer
- Stina Mårtensson (1882–1962), Swedish missionary
- Stina Martini (born 1993), Austrian skater
- Stina Nilsson (born 1993), Swedish biathlete and cross-country skier
- Stina Nordenstam (born 1969), Swedish singer, songwriter, and musician
- Stina Oscarson (1975–2025), Swedish theatre director, author, and debater
- Stina Piper (1734–1800), Swedish freight manager and countess
- Stina Quint (1859–1924), Swedish educator, children's newspaper editor, suffragette, and feminist
- Stina Rautelin (born 1963), Swedish-speaking Finnish actress
- Stina Robson, (formally known as Inga-Stina Robson, Baroness Robson of Kiddington; 1919–1999), Swedish-British political activist
- Stina Segerström (born 1982), Swedish footballer
- Stina Ståhle (1907–1971), Swedish actress
- Stina Svensson (born 1970), Swedish politician
- Stina Torjesen, Norwegian scientist
- Stina Troest (born 1994), Danish hurdler
- Stina Viktorsson (born 1985), Swedish curler
- Stina Wirsén (born 1968), Swedish illustrator
- Stina Wollter (born 1964), Swedish radio host and artist
- Stina Heks, a character in the teen novel series Keeper of the Lost Cities by Shannon Messenger

== See also ==
- Stina Rock, rock formation of the South Georgia and the South Sandwich Islands
- Swedish Translators in North America (STiNA)
- Stina, village in Ukraine
