= Laura Bruce =

American artist

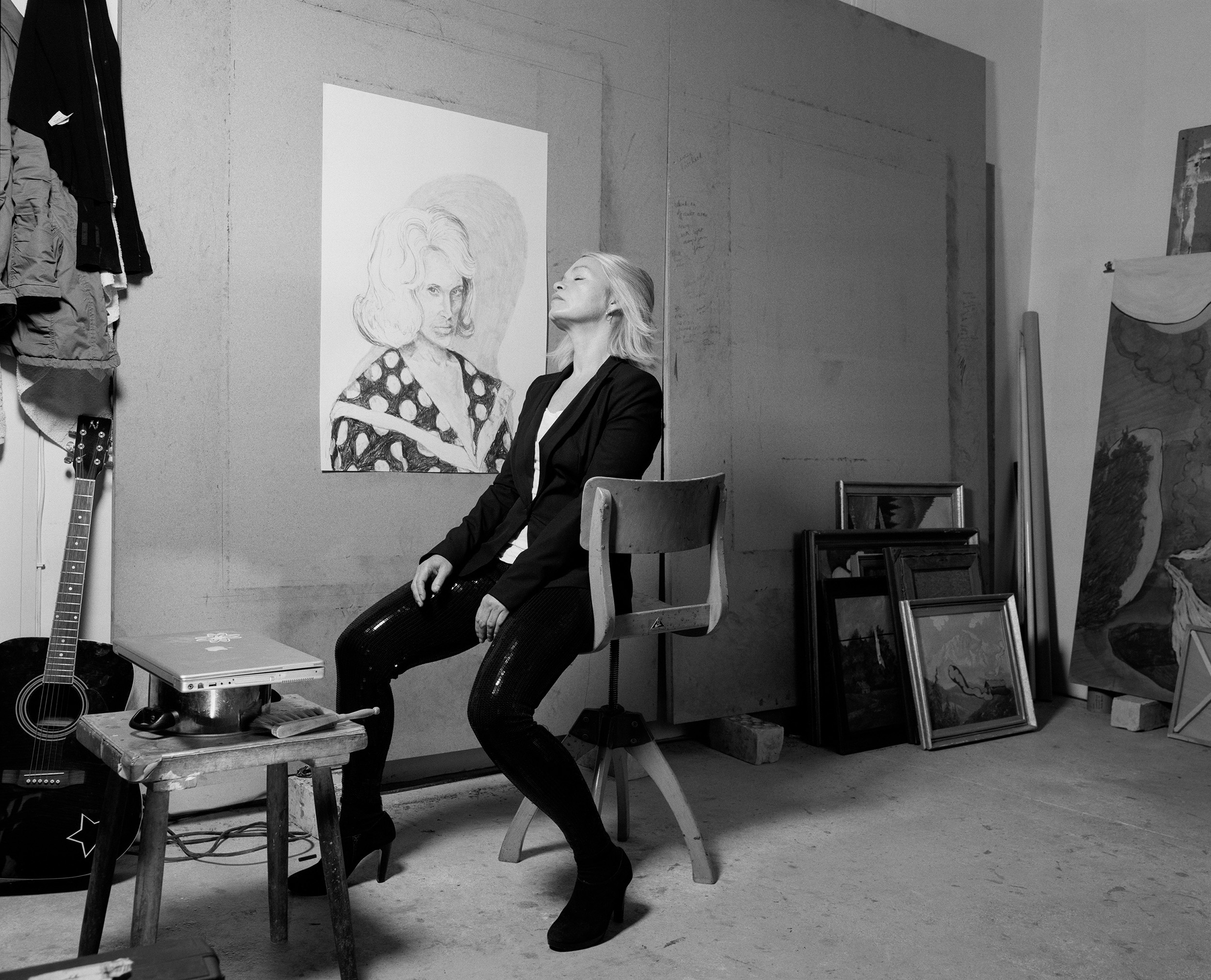
- Laura Bruce in Berlin 2012
- Born: September 28, 1959 (age 66); East Orange, New Jersey, U.S.
- Occupation: Artist
- Website: www.laura-bruce.com

Laura Bruce (born September 28, 1959) is an American contemporary artist living in Berlin.

== Life ==
Bruce studied painting at The State University of New Paltz, New York and sculpture at The Slade School of Fine Art in London. She has been visiting professor at the Exeter School of Art, The Slade School of Fine in London, the Berlin-Weissensee Kunsthochschule, and the Hochschule für Bildende Künste Dresden. Bruce has taught at the summer academies in Leipzig, Bremerhaven, Dresden, and at the Summer Workshops at the Neo Rauch Grafikstiftung. She is an art educator at the Otto Hahn School in Berlin.

Laura Bruce is the lead singer in the concept band Dangerpony, who performed live in 2012 for the exhibition opening I Wish This Was A Song at the Norwegian Museum of Contemporary Art in a program including Jan Köchermann & Doppelgenscher, Diamanda Galas, and Killl.

== Work ==
A close analysis of the works reveals an intuited and abstracted sense of vision on several levels, and not merely in terms of the drawn material applications, subtle speculative hatching contrasted with intense passages of graphite mark making, but rather they are not so much descriptive as an imbued consciousness of place. While this forms a visual paradox of sorts, the viewer has a feeling of substantial ephemerality, an intuited materialisation of landscape that reaches out towards and into the phenomenological ungraspable.

— Mark Gisbourne, exhibition catalog ROHKUNSTBAU XXIV, 2018

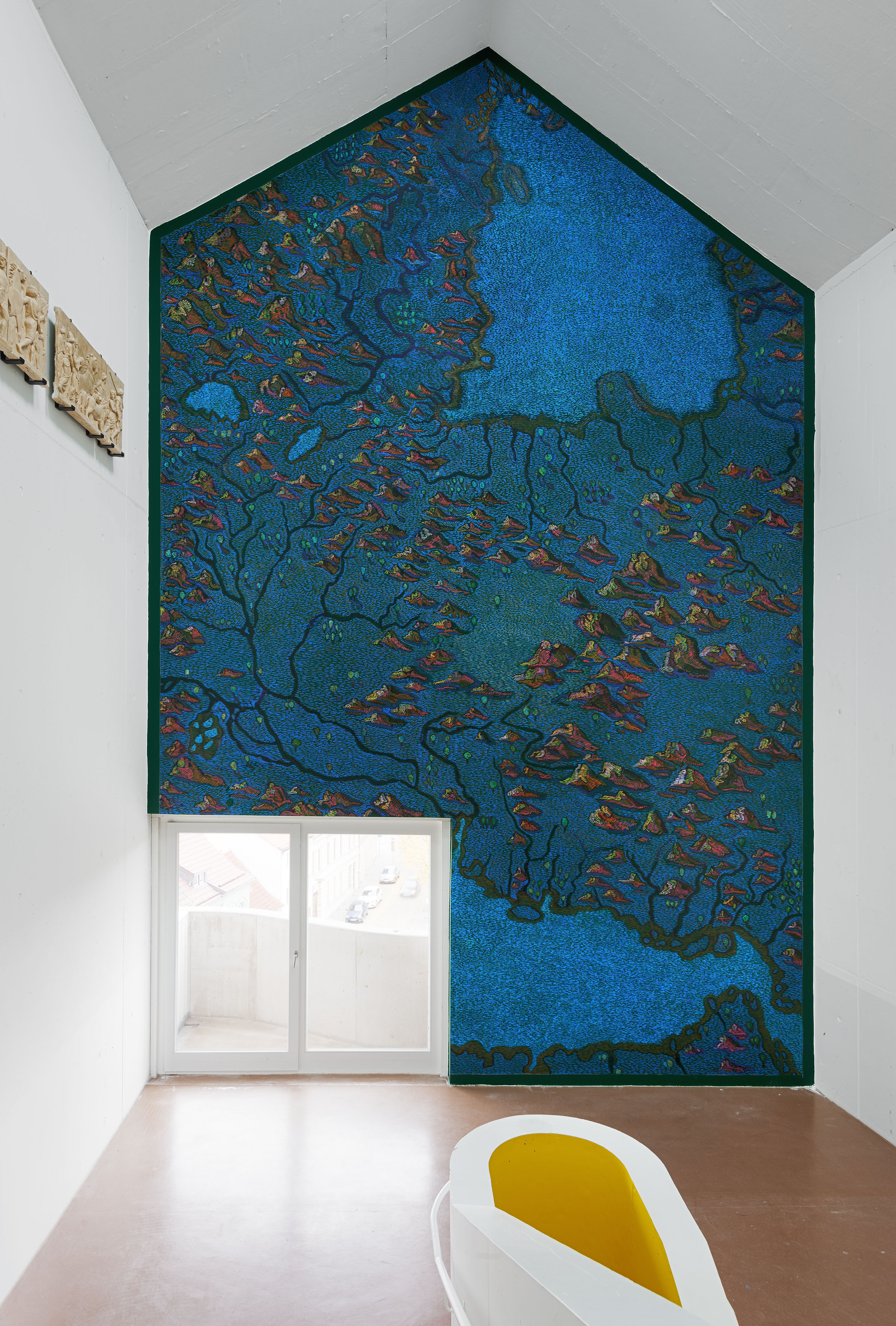
De Septentrione ad Austrum, 2015

Her work explores drawing, painting, sculpture, installation, video and performance. Large-scale black and white graphite drawings are an important part of her oeuvre. They are characterized by bold strokes, clear contrasts of black and white, and a distinctive representation of nature as power / phenomenon / myth and the human relationship to it.

Her drawing process of detailed mark making against smooth, large surfaces of complex gray tones. Her drawings have echoes of 19th century European Romantic painting and Hudson River School painting in the U.S. Bruce often works with historical references, which she approaches from a contemporary perspective, for instance in her installation Perpetual, a work of 79 drawings based on Francisco Goya's Los Caprichos, which she showed in full for the first time at Haus am Waldsee Museum in Berlin in 2018. Or her drawing / sound installation Goodbye is Half the Words You Know (2009-2013), where Bruce presents 10 portraits of classic country singers and reinterprets their songs with her band, Dangerpony. A part of this work was exhibited in 2016 in the exhibition Passion - Fan Behavior and Art (curated by Christoph Tannert) at Künstlerhaus Bethanien, Berlin and the Ludwig Museum, Budapest. It was shown in full in the group exhibition I Wish This Was A Song (curated by Stina Högkvist and Sabrina van der Ley) at the Norwegian Museum of Contemporary Art in 2013.

=== Public collections ===
Bruce' works can be found in the collections of the Neuer Berliner Kunstverein (Artothek and the Video-Forum), the Kupferstichkabinett Berlin, the Berlinische Galerie, the Collection of the City of Mainz and the Vattenfall Foundation, Berlin.

=== Public commissions ===
Laura Bruce's large-format (10 x 6 m) site-specific commission, "De Septentrione ad Astrum" is a permanent mural realized in 2015 in Aschersleben in the Bestehornpark building and officially handed over to the city of Aschersleben.

== Awards ==
- 2012: Losito Kunstpreis
- 2010: Grant of the Senate for Cultural Activities, Berlin
- 2008: Käthe Dorsch Foundation
- 2004: Grant of the Senate for Cultural Activities, Berlin
- 2004: Stiftung Kunstfonds, Bonn
- 2003: Käthe Dorsch Foundation, Berlin

== Exhibitions ==
=== Solo exhibitions (selection) ===
- 2018: To Kiss or Kill, Galerie Rompone, Cologne
- 2015: Love and Other Machines, New Art Projects, London, UK
- 2015: BRUCE SILL, with Heidi Sill, Kunsthaus Erfurt
- 2011: Whippersnapper!!, Fahnemann Projects, Berlin
- 2011: Augenweide, Vattenfall Foundation, Berlin
- 2010: Holy Rollers, with Hannah Dougherty, The Forgotten Bar, Berlin
- 2008: The Hunt, fruehsorge contemporary drawings
- 2007: Night Twist, Delikatessenhaus, Leipzig
- 2006: Landowners, Galerie Pankow, Berlin
- 2005: Big Sky, Galerie Ulrike Buschlinger, Wiesbaden
- 2004: The Wide, Büro für Kunst, Dresden

=== Group exhibitions ===
Year	Exhibition	Location
2019	Inspiration Meisterwerk	Museum Villa Rot
2018	Stadt-Land-Fluss	Museum Boppard, Kurfürstliche Burg
2018	15 Works on Paper	BEERS Gallery, London
2018	Mind the Gap – Rohkunstbau XXIV	Schloss Lieberose
2018	Baustellenfest	Haus am Waldsee, Berlin
2017	Wir nennen es Arbeit	Galleria Opere Scelte, Turin
2017	surf	Galerie Hartwich, Rügen
2017	Striche, Kreise, Landschaft, Preise	Schau Fenster, Berlin
2016	Passion. Fan Behavior and Art.	Ludwig Museum Budapest
2015	Wir kommen auf den Hund	Kupferstichkabinett Berlin
2015	Passion. Fan Behavior and Art.	Künstlerhaus Bethanien Berlin
2015	Paperworlds	Museum der Phantasie, Buchheim
2015	Du sollst dir kein Bild machen	Berliner Dome, Berlin
2014	Criss-Cross	Kunstraum Kreuzberg, Berlin
2013	On Paper	Eigen & Art LAB, Berlin
2013	Die Kunst der Zeichnung	Kunstverein Essenheim / Altes Rathaus Ingelheim
2012	Kühllabor	regionale12, Steiermark
2012	I Wish this Was a Song	Norwegian Museum of Contemporary Art, Oslo
2012	Drawing Biennale	Kunstverein Eislingen
2012	Dies ist die Nacht, die tausend Tagen Trotz kann sagen	Guardini-Stiftung, Berlin
2011	Outdoor Excursions	Burlington City Arts
2010	Reading Room #4 – FUKT MAGAZINE	Nomas Foundation, Rome
2010	km 500 2	Kunsthalle Mainz
2010	Fokus Łódź Biennale	The International Artists' Museum, Łódź
2010	Drawings II	Fahnemann Projects, Berlin
2010	Balmoral Blend	Arp Museum Bahnhof Rolandseck, Remagen
2009	Hortus Apertus	Schloss Balmoral, Bad Ems
2008	Menschen und Orte	Kunstverein Konstanz
2008	City Beats	Zendai Museum of Modern Art, Shanghai
2007	Drunk on Dreams	fruehsorge, Berlin
2004	The Medium is the Tedium	The Collective Gallery, Edinburgh
2003	Expand	Volkart Stiftung, Winterthur
2002	Wachsernde Identitäten	Georg Kolbe Museum
2002	Thin Skin	AXA Gallery, New York
2002	Private Affairs	Kunsthaus Dresden

== Publications ==
=== Catalogs ===
- 2018: Rohkunstbau XXIV: Achtung – Mind the Gap. (Text by Mark Gisbourne)
- 2018: Laura Bruce – To Kiss or Kill. (Rompone Gallery, Cologne)
- 2018: Laura Bruce – Sounds That Clouds Make. Wasmuth, Berlin 2018, ISBN 978-3-8030-3398-7. (Artloft and Alexander Ochs Berlin. Text by Gregory Volk)
- 2016: What We Do For Love. (Studio Barbara Krimm. Text by Nicola Kuhn)
- 2016: Moment und Dauer. (Parterre Gallery, Berlin. Texts by Kathleen Krenzlin, Jens Semrau and Christian Ulrich)
- 2015: Wir kommen auf den Hund. ISBN 978-3-7319-0237-9. (Kupferstichkabinett Berlin. Text von Andreas Schalhorn.)
- 2015: Passion. Fan Behavior and Art. ISBN 978-3-941230-45-3. (Künstlerhaus Bethanien, Berlin. Text by Christoph Tannert)
- 2014: Paperworlds. ISBN 978-3-86206-333-8. (eds. Valeska Hagenay and Sylvia Volz)
- 2014: A Line is a Line is a Line. (Pankow Gallery, Berlin. Texts by Anke Paula Böttcher, Anette Tietz, Nanne Meyer)
- 2013: ungesehen und unerhört. ISBN 978-3-88423-406-8. (Prinzhorn Collection, Heidelberg. Text by Thomas Röske)
- 2013: Die Kunst der Zeichnung. (Kunstverein Essenheim / Altes Rathaus Ingelheim, Text by Andreas Preywisch)
- 2012: Drawing Biennale. ISBN 978-3-929947-47-2. (Kunstverein Eislingen, Eislingen. Text by Günther Baumann)
- 2012: I Wish This Was A Song. (Nasjonal Museet – Museum of Contemporary Art, Oslo. Text by Sabrina van der Ley)
- 2011: Outdoor Excursions. (Burlington City Arts. Text by Gregory Volk)
- 2011: Laura Bruce – Whippersnapper!! (Fahnemann Gallery, Berlin. Interview ny Andreas Schalhorn)
- 2010: The First Dimension. Birkhäuser, Basel 2010. ISBN 978-3-0346-0367-6. (eds. Helmut Germer and Thomas Neeser)
- 2010: Laura Bruce: The Castle Drawings. Birkhäuser, Basel 2010, ISBN 978-3-941560-71-0. (Texts by Jutta Mattern, Helmut Germer, Thomas Neeser)
- 2009: Was ist dass? (espace artcore / JTM Gallery, Paris)
- 2009: The Carnival Within. (Uferhallen, Berlin. Texts by Gregory Volk and Sabine Russ)
- 2008: Laura Bruce –The Hunt. OCLC 315929136. (fruehsorge, Berlin. Text by Gregory Volk)
- 2006: Laura Bruce – Landowners. (Pankow Gallery. Text von Christoph Tannert)
- 2004: Laura Bruce. ISBN 978-3-86572-516-5. (Texts by Mark Gisbourne and Uta Grundmann)
- 2002: Wächsernde Identitäten. (Georg Kolbe Museum, Berlin)
- 2002: Thin Skin. ISBN 978-0-916365-64-6. (Independent Curators International, New York)
- 2002: Private Affairs. (Kunsthaus Dresden)

=== Press ===
- 2017: BOMB Magazine, artist's supplement, Nr. 142
- 2007: Drunk on Dreams, FUKT MAGAZINE
- 2006: The Animation Issue, FUKT MAGAZINE
- 2005: Article: Endlich glücklich sitzen, Frankfurter Allgemeine Zeitung, 22. März
- 2004: Article: The hidden beauty of everyday objects we take for granted, Scotland on Sunday, 29. Feb.

== Dangerpony ==
- 2016: KGB Sounds, Heimathafen Berlin
- 2014: Podewil, Berlin
- 2013: Neuer Berliner Kunstverein, Berlin
- 2012: Missklang, West Germany, Berlin
- 2012: I Wish This Was A Song, Norwegian Museum of Contemporary Art, Oslo, Norway
- 2010: Picture disk vinyl release, West Germany, Berlin
- 2009: The Carnival Within, Uferhallen, Berlin
