= CCID (protocol) =

USB Protocol

CCID (chip card interface device) protocol is a USB protocol that allows a smartcard to be connected to a USB host (computer, smartphone...) via a card reader using a standard USB interface, without the need for each manufacturer of smartcards to provide its own reader or protocol. This allows the smartcard to be used as a security token for authentication and data encryption, such as that used in BitLocker. Chip card interface devices come in a variety of forms. The smallest CCID form is a standard USB dongle and may contain a SIM card or Secure Digital card inside the USB dongle. Another popular interface is a USB smart card reader keyboard, which in addition to being a standard USB keyboard, has a built-in slot for accepting a smartcard. However, not all CCID compliant devices accept removable smartcards, for example, select Yubikey hardware authentication devices support CCID, where they play the role of both the card reader and the smartcard itself.

As the protocol is based primarily around interaction with smartcards, it builds around the ISO/IEC 7816-4 and ISO 7816-3 as main way of communication with the smartcard, or with the device itself in case of some USB security tokens.

== Hardware implementation ==
According to the CCID specification by the USB standards work group, a CCID exchanges information through a host computer over USB by using a CCID message that consists of a 10-byte header followed by message-specific data. The standard defines fourteen commands that the host computer can use to send data and status and control information in messages. Every command requires at least one response message from the CCID.

== Software driver ==
CCID driver support has been natively supported by Microsoft beginning with Windows 2000. Apple has included some form of native CCID support since Mac OS X, with support evolving alongside Common Access Card and Personal Identity Verification specifications set by the US Federal Government. Apple has included native CCID support on iOS since 16.0 and iPadOS since 16.1. On Linux and other Unixes, CCID and CT-API devices are usually accessed with user-space drivers, for which no special kernel adaptation is required.

== List of CCID providers ==
- Advanced Card Systems
- ActivIdentity
- Baltech
- Bit4id
- BLUTRONICS
- Elyctis
- FEITIAN Technologies
- Gemalto
- Giesecke & Devrient
- HID Global
- JaCarta
- rf IDEAS
- SafeNet
- SecuTech Solutions
- SpringCard
- Verisign
- Yubico
- Reiner Kartenlesegeräte
- DUALi
