= OpenPGP card =

Type of cryptographic smart card

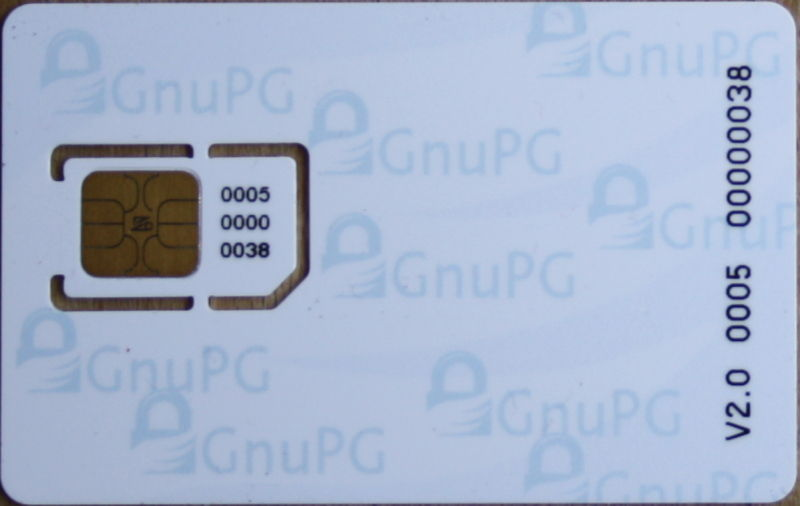
This is an image of an OpenPGP card from the vendor ZeitControl. This card is pre-punched to be used in ID-000 readers, as shown below

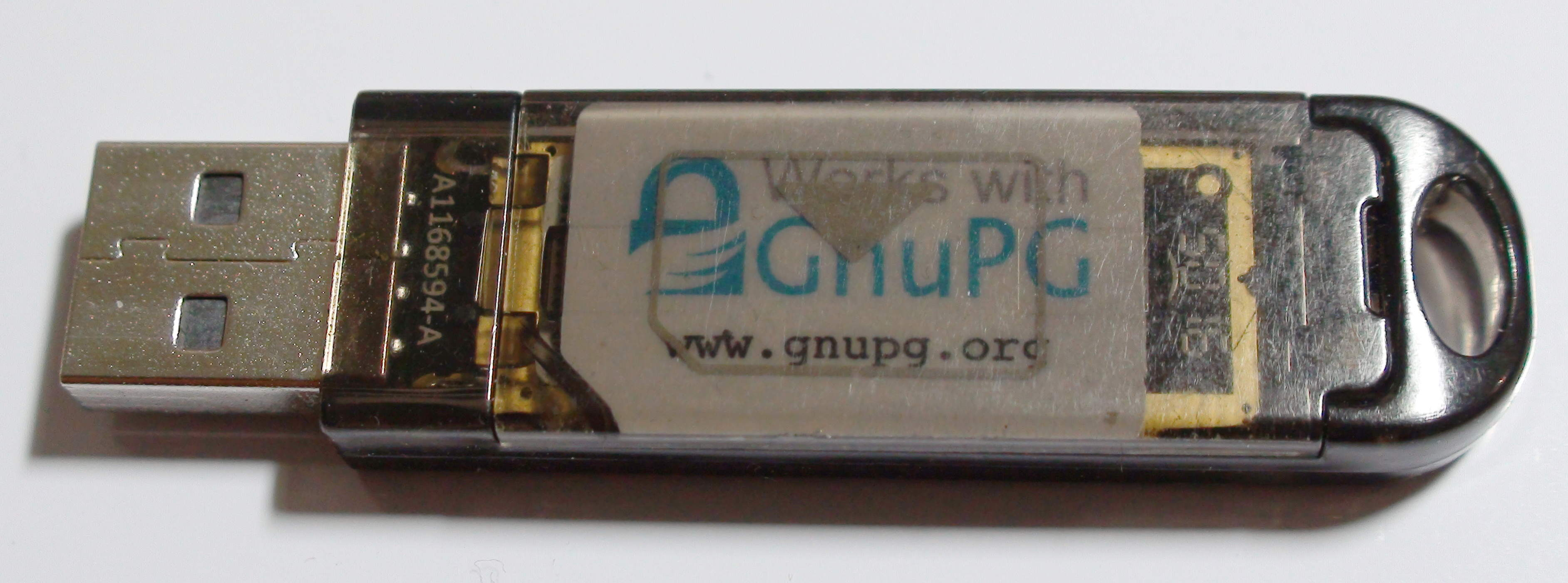

In cryptography, the OpenPGP card is an ISO/IEC 7816-4, -8 compatible smart card that is integrated with many OpenPGP functions. Using this smart card, various cryptographic tasks (encryption, decryption, digital signing/verification, authentication etc.) can be performed. It allows secure storage of secret key material; all versions of the protocol state, "Private keys and passwords cannot be read from the card with any command or function." However, new key pairs may be loaded onto the card at any time, overwriting the existing ones.

The original OpenPGP card was built on BasicCard, and remains available at retail. Several mutually compatible JavaCard implementations of the OpenPGP Card's interface protocol are available as open source software and can be installed on generic JavaCard smart cards, including NFC-enabled cards. Nitrokey and Yubico provide USB tokens implementing the same protocol through smart card emulation.

The smart card daemon, in combination with the supported smart card readers, as implemented in GnuPG, can be used for many cryptographic applications. With gpg-agent in GnuPG 2, an ssh-agent implementation using GnuPG, an OpenPGP card can be used for SSH authentication also.

== Vendor IDs ==
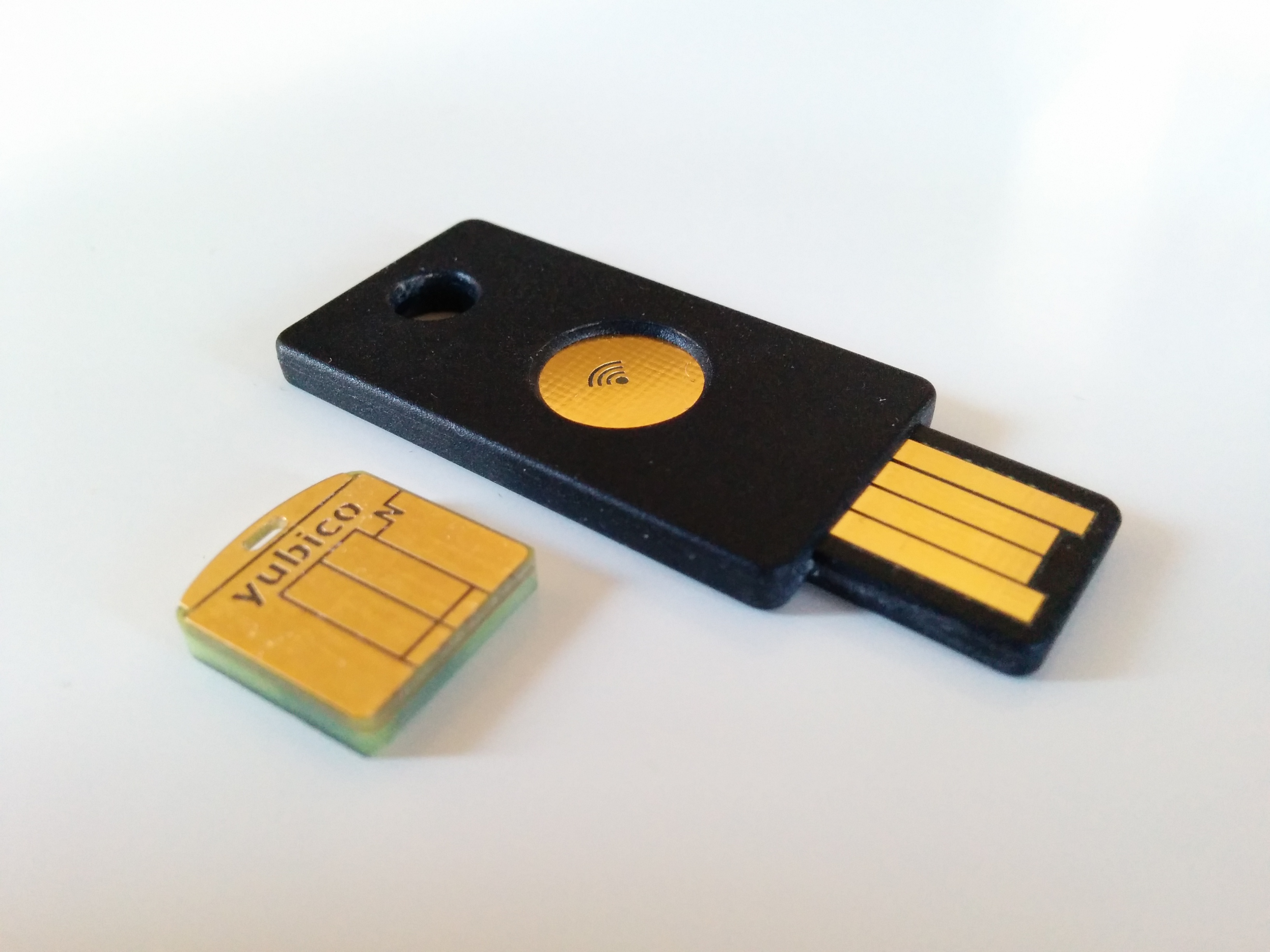
Yubico USB devices implement OpenPGP card and HOTP cryptographic algorithms.

An OpenPGP card features a unique serial number to allow software to ask for a specific card. Serial numbers are assigned on a vendor basis and vendors are registered with the FSFE.

Assigned vendor ids are:

ID	Name	Assignation date	Comment
0x0000	Testcard	Specification	Reserved for testing.
0x0001	PPC Card Systems	Specification	
0x0002	Prism Payment Technologies	2005-09-02	
0x0003	OpenFortress Digital signatures	2006-03-10	
0x0004	Wewid AB	2008-01-26	
0x0005	ZeitControl cardsystems GmbH	2009-06-02	
0x0006	Yubico AB	2012-11-15	
0x0007	OpenKMS	2014-01-20	
0x0008	LogoEmail	2014-11-03	
0x0009	Fidesmo AB	2015-10-21	
0x000A	VivoKey	2016-03-12	
0x000B	Feitian Technologies	2020-01-20	
0x000D	Dangerous Things	2021-03-09	
0x000E	Excelsecu	2021-03-09	
0x000F	Nitrokey	2022-07-28	
0x0010	NeoPGP	2024-05-26	
0x0011	Token2	2024-05-22	
0x002A	Magrathea	2009-05-25	
0x0042	GnuPG e.V.	2017-11-01	
0x1337	Warsaw Hackerspace	2014-12-08	
0x2342	warpzone e.V.	2016-04-25	
0x4354	Confidential Technologies	2018-10-04	
0x5343	SSE Carte à puce	2021-06-10	
0x5443	TIF-IT e.V.	<= 2020-01-28	
0x63AF	Trustica s.r.o	2018-04-05	
0xBA53	c-base e.V.	2020-03-03	
0xBD0E	Paranoidlabs	2018-02-01	
0xCA05	Atos CardOS	2022-05-10	
0xF1D0	CanoKeys	2021-11-04	
0xF517	Free Software Initiative of Japan	2010-09-06	
0xF5EC	F-Secure	2020-02-21	
0xFF00..FFFE	Random	Specification	Range reserved for randomly assigned serial numbers.
0xFFFF	Testcard	Specification	Reserved for testing.
