= Gastón Taratuta =

Argentine businessman

- Born: Christian Gastón Taratuta; 29 June 1972 (age 54); Buenos Aires, Argentina
- Education: Florida International University
- Occupation: Businessman
- Known for: Founder and CEO of Aleph Group
- Awards: EY Entrepreneur of the Year Award

Christian Gastón Taratuta (born 29 June 1972) is an Argentine businessman. He is the founder and chief executive officer of Aleph Group (formerly Aleph Holding), a digital advertising company that serves as a commercial partner to online platforms such as X, TikTok and Spotify in markets where they do not operate directly. The company grew out of IMS Internet Media Services, which Taratuta founded in 2005.

== Early career ==
Taratuta worked for six years at Universo Online (UOL), a Brazilian internet company, based in its Miami office. He left in 2004 as head of the company's international operations.

== IMS and Aleph ==
Taratuta founded IMS in Miami in 2005 with, according to his own account, about US$5,000 in capital. Beginning in 2011, the company secured agreements to represent Twitter commercially in international markets. In 2015 Sony acquired 51% of the company; Taratuta repurchased part of that stake in 2019, with Sony remaining a minority shareholder.

IMS was later reorganized into Aleph Holding, which also included Httpool, AdDynamo and Social Snack. In July 2021 CVC Capital Partners agreed to acquire a minority stake of about US$470 million, in a deal that valued the company at about US$2 billion. Around the same time, Taratuta appointed Imran Khan, a former Snap executive, as chairman of the board.

Aleph filed confidentially for an initial public offering in the United States in October 2021 and filed a public registration statement in 2022, which identified Taratuta and chief operating officer Ignacio Vidaguren as controlling shareholders through the vehicle Aleph IMS. The company later withdrew the filing; Taratuta attributed the decision to market conditions. In 2023 the company reported about 1,500 employees and investments from CVC, Mercado Libre, Sony, Twitter and Snap.

Aleph subsequently expanded into payments, launching Aleph Payments in 2023 and later acquiring the cross-border payments company Localpayment.

== Awards ==
Taratuta was named the EY World Entrepreneur Of The Year for 2022, the first Argentine to receive the award.
