= Stina Högkvist =

Swedish art curator and art historian

- Born: 1972 (age 53–54); Sweden
- Occupation: Curator

Stina Högkvist is a Swedish art curator and an art historian. Together with Norwegian curator Marianne Zamecznik, she founded the Simon Says curatorial platform in Stockholm, Sweden, and ran it between 2001 and 2003. She has been working at the National Museum in Oslo, Norway, since 2006, where she is now director of collections.

In 2009, she co-curated Hypocrisy: The Site Specificity of Morality with Cameroonian curator Koyo Kouoh at the Norwegian Museum of Contemporary Art. The same year, she co-curated the 5th MOMENTUM biennale in Moss, Norway, with Slovenian curator Lina Džuverović.

She curated several projects with Norwegian curator Geir Haraldseth, including the exhibition Luringen at the KUIR festival in Bogota, Colombia in 2017.

== Publications ==
- Stina Högkvist and Koyo Kouoh, eds., Hypocrisy: The Site Specificity of Morality, with texts by Stina Högkvist, Koyo Kouoh, Shaheen Merali, and Helge Ryggvik, Oslo: National Museum of Art, Architecture and Design, 2009, 104 p., English / Norwegian, ISBN 978-82-8154-037-8
