= SAES Getters =

Italian joint stock company

SAES Getters S.p.A.
- Type: Join Stock Company
- Traded as: BIT: SG
- Industry: Electronic Components
- Founded: 1940 in Florence, Italy
- Headquarters: Lainate, Milan, Italy
- Key people: Massimo della Porta (President); Giulio Canale (Vice President and managing director)
- Products: Dispensers; Functional Chemicals; Gas Purifiers; Getters; Shape Memory Alloys; Special Products; Vacuum pumps
- Revenue: ▲€199.1 million (2021)
- Number of employees: 1169 (2021)
- Website: www.saesgetters.com

SAES Getters S.p.A. is an Italian joint stock company, established in 1940. It is the parent company of the SAES industrial group, which focusses its business on the production of components and systems in advanced materials patented by the same company and used in various industrial and medical applications.

== History ==
=== 1940s and 50s ===
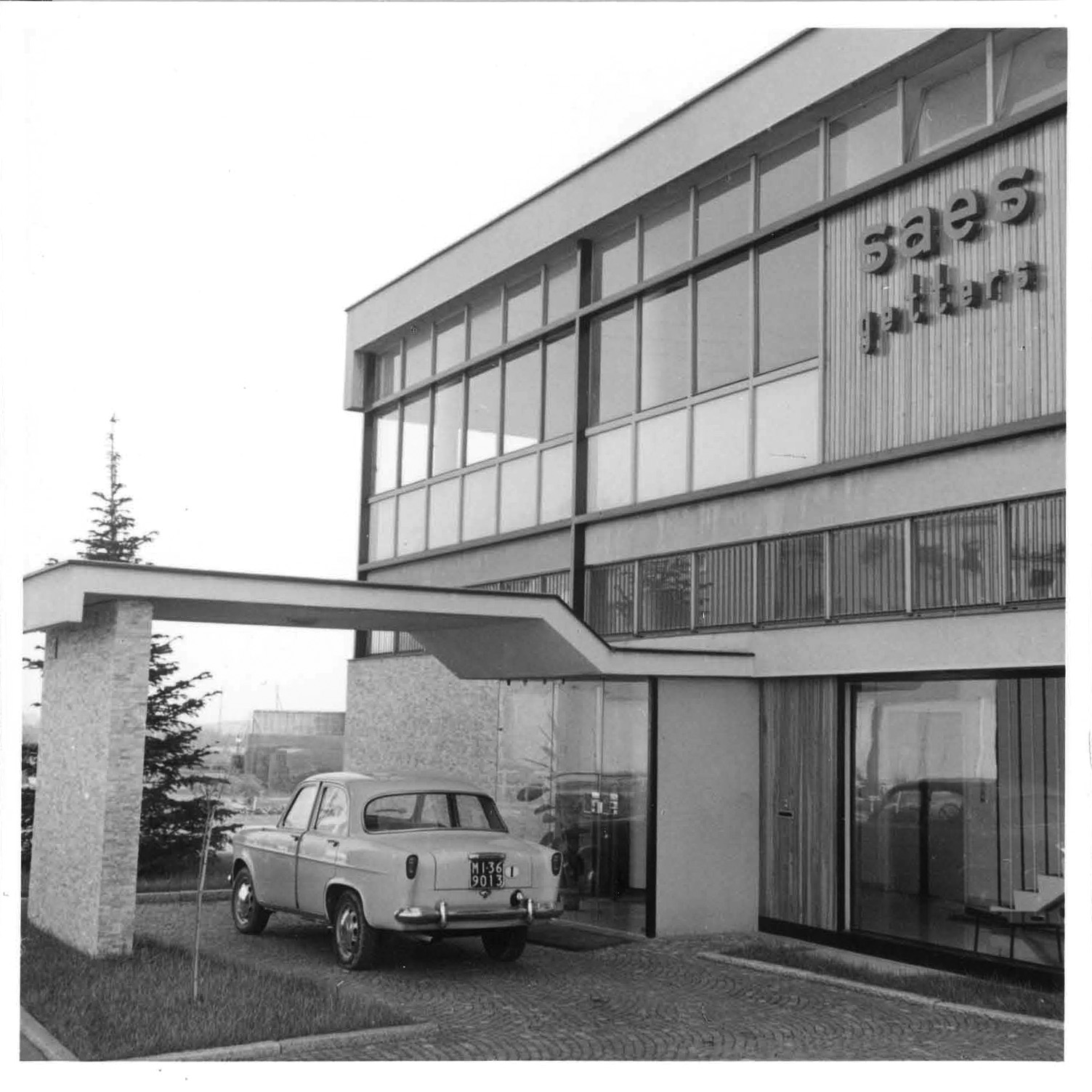
S.A.E.S. historical building in Milan.

In 1940 the company S.A.E.S. (Società Apparecchi Elettrici e Scientifici) was formed in Florence at the initiative of Ernesto Gabbrielli, an engineer from Montecatini Terme and two other shareholders. The impetus for the foundation of the company was the discovery by Gabbrielli of a new method for the production of getters, with nickel lids to protect barium plastics, to prevent the phenomenon of oxidation. S.A.E.S. initially devoted itself to producing time clocks and a barium-magnesium-aluminium alloy. After a few years, it transferred its headquarters to Milan and began to produce electrical resistance heaters.

In 1946, the Della Porta and Canale families entered the shareholding structure, and in 1949, Paolo della Porta joined the company, subsequently taking over management in 1952. A period began that was distinguished by major innovations, supported by the Research and Development Laboratory, notably the invention of ring-shaped getters in barium-aluminium alloy. The company expanded into Europe, appointing its first agents in France, Germany, and England.

S.A.E.S. continued to invest in scientific research during a period of major change in the electronics sector, characterised by the extensive spread of transistors, to the detriment of vacuum tubes intended for radio and television reception and transmission. In 1957 S.A.E.S. filed a patent for getters for television cathode tubes, first for black and white and then for colour television, launching production on an industrial scale.

=== 1960s and 70s ===
This period was characterised by company consolidations, innovations and commercial successes, including at international level. S.A.E.S. also commissioned its first mass production plant. At the "3rd Symposium on Residual Gases", held in Rome in 1967, S.A.E.S. presented a new configuration of getter, consisting of a metallic tape coated with St 101 alloy, obtained from the combination of zirconium and aluminium. This technological evolution allowed the company to execute new products with Non-Evaporable Getters (NEG) and getter pumps. The non-evaporable getter pumps (NEG pumps) are devices which have the same purpose as barium getters but do not require an evaporation process; they have extremely high absorptive capacity and are still used today, in more advanced forms, in applications requiring a high or ultra-high vacuum.

Exploiting its own technological skills in the field of metallurgy, during these two decades, S.A.E.S. developed new alloys (such as the St 707 alloy in zirconium, vanadium and iron) and was involved in projects on the catalytic module and purifiers of inert gases.

It also pursued its internationalisation with the creation of subsidiaries with commercial responsibilities in the United Kingdom (1966), United States (1969), Canada (1969) and Japan (1973). Other commercial representative offices were opened in France (1978) and in Germany (1979). In 1977, SAES Getters USA Inc. was founded in Colorado Springs, the first foreign subsidiary with a manufacturing mission for satisfying the growing demand for porous non-evaporable getters from the US military industry.

S.A.E.S. continued to grow by virtue of the progressive launch of new products and the expansion of its production structure, both through the construction of new plants and acquisitions of other companies. In 1978, it had grown to 300 employees, redefined its company structure and changed its name, from S.A.E.S. to SAES Getters.

=== 1980s ===
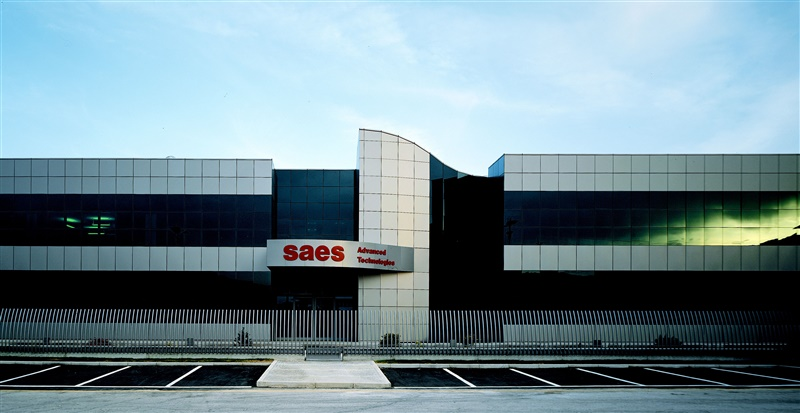
SAES Advanced Technologies' building in Avezzano, Italy.

In 1982, a plant was commissioned in Nanjing, in China, for the production of barium getters, the installations for which were supplied directly by SAES Getters.

The objective during this period was the vertical integration of production (or the internal management of all processes), which over the years would become one of the group's strong points. From this perspective, in 1984, SAES Metallurgia was founded in Avezzano (Province of L’Aquila), for the production of barium and barium-aluminium alloy, SAES Engineering, for the execution of instruments and devices necessary for the metallurgical processing of alloys, and SAES Gemedis dedicated to the production of Gemedis (Getter Mercury Dispenser), i.e. alloys containing mercury. Over the course of the 1990s, the three companies merged into SAES Advanced Technologies S.p.A., adding to their own portfolio numerous other articles and devices used constantly in Hi-Tech applications requiring a vacuum or ultrahigh vacuum.

In the mid-1980s, SAES Getters concluded two important acquisitions in the United States in the field of barium getters for cathode tubes and created Getters Corporation of America.

In 1986, SAES Getters was listed on the stock exchange, with the financial resources raised allowing it to pursue its acquisitions policy, most notably, towards the end of the decade, the Californian company Cryolab Inc., subsequently renamed SAES Pure Gas Inc., within which it still develops and produces gas purification products, principally for the semiconductor industry.

In 1989, Massimo della Porta, Paolo's son, began to work for SAES Metallurgia. Over the years, Massimo took on increasingly important roles until he was appointed Chairman of SAES Getters in 2009.

=== 1990s ===
At the start of the 1990s, the entire activity of the group was encompassed in three sectors: barium getters for the television industry, non-evaporable getters, NEG pumps and metal dispensers for industrial and scientific applications, gas purifiers and analyzers for the semiconductor industry. Over the decade, production companies were established in South Korea and China and commercial companies in Singapore and Taiwan.

In 1996, to meet the new requirements of the company in the fields of production and research, the new headquarters was inaugurated in Lainate. During the same year, SAES Getters became the first Italian company to be listed on Nasdaq, the most important equity market in the US for high-tech companies (on which the company remained until 2003, the year in which it requested a delisting).

During the second half of the 1990s, with the succession of technologies in the field of televisions, SAES Getters, sensing the importance of new market developments, expanded its own field of production and focused on technologies widespread in the flat display sector, in particular, mercury dispensers for backlight lamps for LCD (Liquid Crystal Display) for monitors and televisions.

=== 2000s ===
In 2000, Paolo della Porta was named the Entrepreneur of the year in Italy and in 2001, he was appointed "World Entrepreneur of the Year" in Italy by Ernst & Young - this recognition consolidated the image of the company at an international level.

Overall, this decade signalled a notable change for the entire company, with its structure reorganised through new acquisitions and company policy evolving significantly, which, characterised by innovation and diversification, focused increasingly on expanding its technology portfolio in advanced materials. This strategy led SAES Getters to specialise in the execution of components and systems for high-tech industrial and medical applications, allowing the company to survive unscathed after the collapse of a number of key markets, such as barium getters for the television industry or back lights for LCD screens. Furthermore, during this period, the company developed highly innovative technologies and processes for the depositing of getters on silicon wafers for so-called MEMS (Micro Electro-Mechanical Systems), miniaturised devices intended for various applications, such as sensors and gyroscopes.

The company entered the shape memory alloy sector (SMA), becoming a key reference for the sector and the first producer of SMA devices and materials for use in industry. In this way, SAES acquired Memory Metalle GmbH (renamed Memry GmbH in 2010), a German company with metallurgical and application skills relating to SMA in the field of medicine. It also acquired two companies in the United States: Memry Corporation, specialising in the production of SMA devices for medical use and the business division of Special Metal Corporation, dedicated to the production of NiTiNol (renamed SAES Smart Materials). NiTiNol is the commercial name of shape memory alloys used in medicine and the SAES group is one of the major international suppliers of this material. SAES then launched the production of SMA wires and springs for industrial applications at its Italian facilities, with these now concentrated at its headquarters in Lainate.

In this context, in 2011, together with the German company Alfmeier, SAES Getters established the 50-50 joint venture in Germany, Actuator Solutions GmbH, to boost its own competitiveness at international level in the fields of development, production and marketing of SMA-wire-based actuators. In 2014, the joint venture won the "German Innovation Award" in the medium-sized company category.

The group is also strengthening its presence in the field of purification, with the acquisition of a division of the company Power & Energy (Ivyland, Pennsylvania, United States), with the aim of expanding its production of palladium membrane purifiers.

At the same time, the Research and Innovation area of the company is developing innovative hybrid technologies, which integrate getter materials into polymer matrices, initially concentrating on the development of dispensable absorbers for organic electronics applications, in particular OLED (Organic Light Emitting Diodes) light displays and sources. From 2013 onwards, further developments of the polymer technological platform have permitted the group to execute new functional polymer compounds, with the properties of interacting with the gases and optical, mechanical and surface modifying functions, according to the requirements and applications of interest, including implantable medical devices, food packaging and the field of energy storage (lithium batteries and super condensers).

In 2010, it also established the company ETC, the fruit of a collaboration between CNR and SAES Getters (the majority shareholder). An innovative research programme was launched within ETC for the development of OLET technology (Organic Light Emitting Transistor).

== Technologies ==
=== Material science ===
The group is mainly focused on advanced alloys, advanced inorganic materials, polymer-matrix composites, and thin metal films.

=== Solid state chemistry ===
SAES Getters exploits solid-state chemistry to manage multiphase solid-state reactions among one or more solid phases. Evaporable getters, mercury dispensers, alkali metal dispensers are examples of products based on solid-state reactions.

=== Metallurgy ===
The company has been dealing for decades with vacuum metallurgy (arc melting and vacuum induction melting) and powder metallurgy (milling technologies, sieving, powders classification and mixing, screen printing, and sintering). In particular, by the available sintering technologies, processes under high vacuum or inert atmosphere and controlled conditions of temperature, time (traditional sintering), and pressure (hot uniaxial pressing and cold isostatic pressing) can be performed, allowing to obtain either highly porous either full dense sintered bodies.

=== Shape memory alloys ===
SMA are materials that can exhibit the property of remembering their original shape even after being severely deformed. Thanks to their intrinsic shape memory and superelastic effects, they represent an enabling technology for implantable medical devices and actuators. SAES Getters deals with designing new materials on a theoretical level, developing new alloys on an industrial scale, and modeling and manufacturing new components.

=== Functional Polymer composites chemistry ===
It is a bundle of technologies grown at SAES to develop advanced polymeric materials that integrate getter properties and rapidly expand towards other functionalities. These materials can be in the form of dispensable polymer composites, functional compounds, and functional coatings for a wide variety of applications, from consumer electronics to implantable medical devices to food packaging and special packaging in general.

=== Gas ultra purification ===
The SAES group manages the purification of gases, either under ultra-high vacuum, or at atmospheric pressure. It deals with enabling the generation of ultra-high pure gases, characterized by impurity concentrations below 1 part-per-billion (ppb).

=== Vacuum science and technology ===
This is the oldest and strongest technology owned by the SAES group, which deals with the design of both ultra-high vacuum pumps and pure metal sources, based on a variety of vacuum gas dynamics codes and on the building of proprietary high-vacuum manufacturing tools, ranging from thin film deposition tools to vacuum reactors.

=== Physical vapour deposition ===
The company developed a range of technologies enabling the deposition of pure metals and alloys on several kinds of substrates. Sputtering is normally used to deposit high surface area getter alloys onto silicon wafers, used by the vacuum MEMS industry as cap wafers, to create and maintain a well-defined gas composition inside MEMS cavities.

== Products ==
The SAES group's organizational structure is composed of three units dedicated to different technologic solutions: Industrial Applications Business Unit, Shape Memory Alloys (SMA) Business Unit, Business Development Unit.

=== Industrial Applications Business Unit ===
==== Electronic & Photonic Devices ====
The SAES group provides advanced technological solutions to the electronic devices of a wide range of markets, including the aeronautical, medical, industrial, security, defence, and basic research sectors. The products developed in this division include getters of different types and formats, alkaline metal dispensers, cathodes, and materials for thermal management. The offered products are employed in various devices such as X-ray tubes, microwave tubes, solid-state lasers, electron sources, photomultiplier, and radiofrequency amplification systems.

==== Sensors and Detectors ====
SAES Getters produces getters of different types and formats that are employed in various devices such as night vision devices based on infrared sensors, pressure sensors, gyroscopes for navigation systems, and MEMS devices of various natures.

==== Light Sources ====
The company supplies getters and metal dispensers for lamps.

==== Vacuum Systems ====
The company produces pumps based on non-vaporable getter materials (NEG), which can be applied in both industrial and scientific fields (for example, in analytical instrumentation, vacuum systems for research activities, and particle accelerators).

==== Thermal Insulation ====
The solutions for vacuum thermal insulation include NEG products for cryogenic applications, for solar collectors both for home applications and operating at high temperatures and for thermos. Furthermore, SAES is particularly active in the development of innovative getter solutions for vacuum insulating panels for the white goods industry.

==== Pure Gas Handling ====
In the microelectronics market, SAES Getters develops and sells advanced gas purification systems for the semiconductors industry and other industries that use pure gases. Through the subsidiary SAES Pure Gas, Inc., the group offers a full range of purifiers for bulk gases and special gases.

=== Shape Memory Alloys (SMA) Business Unit ===
The SAES group produces semi-finished products, components, and devices in shape memory alloy, and a special alloy made of nickel-titanium (NiTinol), characterized by super-elasticity (a property that allows the material to withstand even large deformations, returning then to its original form) and by the property of assuming predefined forms when subjected to heat treatment.

==== SMA Medical Applications ====
NiTinol is used in a wide range of medical devices, particularly in the cardiovascular field. In fact, its superelastic properties are ideal for the manufacturing of the devices used in the field of non-invasive surgery, such as catheters to navigate within the cardiovascular system and self-expanding devices (aortic and peripheral stents or heart valves).

==== SMA Industrial Applications ====
The shape memory alloy is used in producing various devices (valves, proportional valves, actuators, release systems, and mini-actuators). The use of SMA devices in the industrial field goes across the board of many application areas such as domotics, the white goods industry, the automotive business, and consumer electronics.

=== Business Development Unit ===
The SAES group has developed the platform of Functional Polymer Composites in the past few years, where getter functionalities, as well as optical and mechanical features, are incorporated into polymer matrices. Originally designed and used for the protection of OLED (Organic Light Emitting Diodes) displays and lamps, these new materials are now being tailored also for new areas such as food packaging and implantable medical devices among others.

Relying on the same FPC platform, the group is also active in the field of new-generation electrochemical devices for energy storage, such as super-capacitors and lithium batteries, primarily intended for the market of hybrid and electric engines.

== Corporate affairs ==
The main shareholders are:

- SGG Holding S.p.A. – 47.32%
- Carisma S.p.A. – 5.80%
- Berger Trust s.r.l. – 2.73%
