= Norwegian Museum of Contemporary Art =

Museum in Oslo, Norway

Coordinates: 59.9085°N 10.7411°E

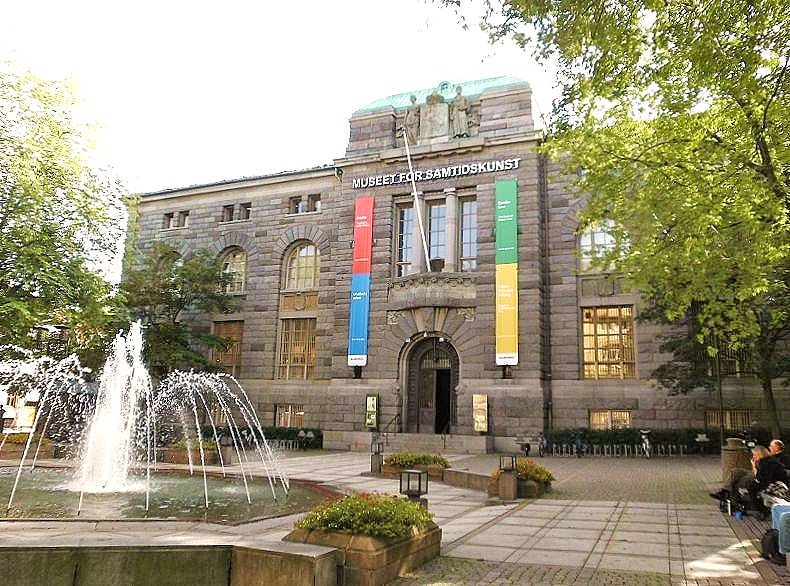
Norwegian Museum of Contemporary Art

The Norwegian Museum of Contemporary Art (Norwegian: Museet for samtidskunst) is a museum in Oslo, Norway. Since 2003, it is administratively a part of the National Museum of Art, Architecture and Design.

== History ==
The Norwegian Museum of Contemporary Art was established in 1988 with works received from the National Gallery of Norway and opened in 1990 as a museum for art produced after World War II. In 1992, the National Touring Exhibition (Riksgalleriet) was separated as an independent entity. The building, designed by architect Ingvar Hjorth (1862-1927), was formerly used by Norges Bank. Former directors of the museum were Jan Brockmann (1988–1996) and Per Bjarne Boym (1996–2003).
