= Stina Ehrensvärd =

Swedish-American entrepreneur, innovator and industrial designer

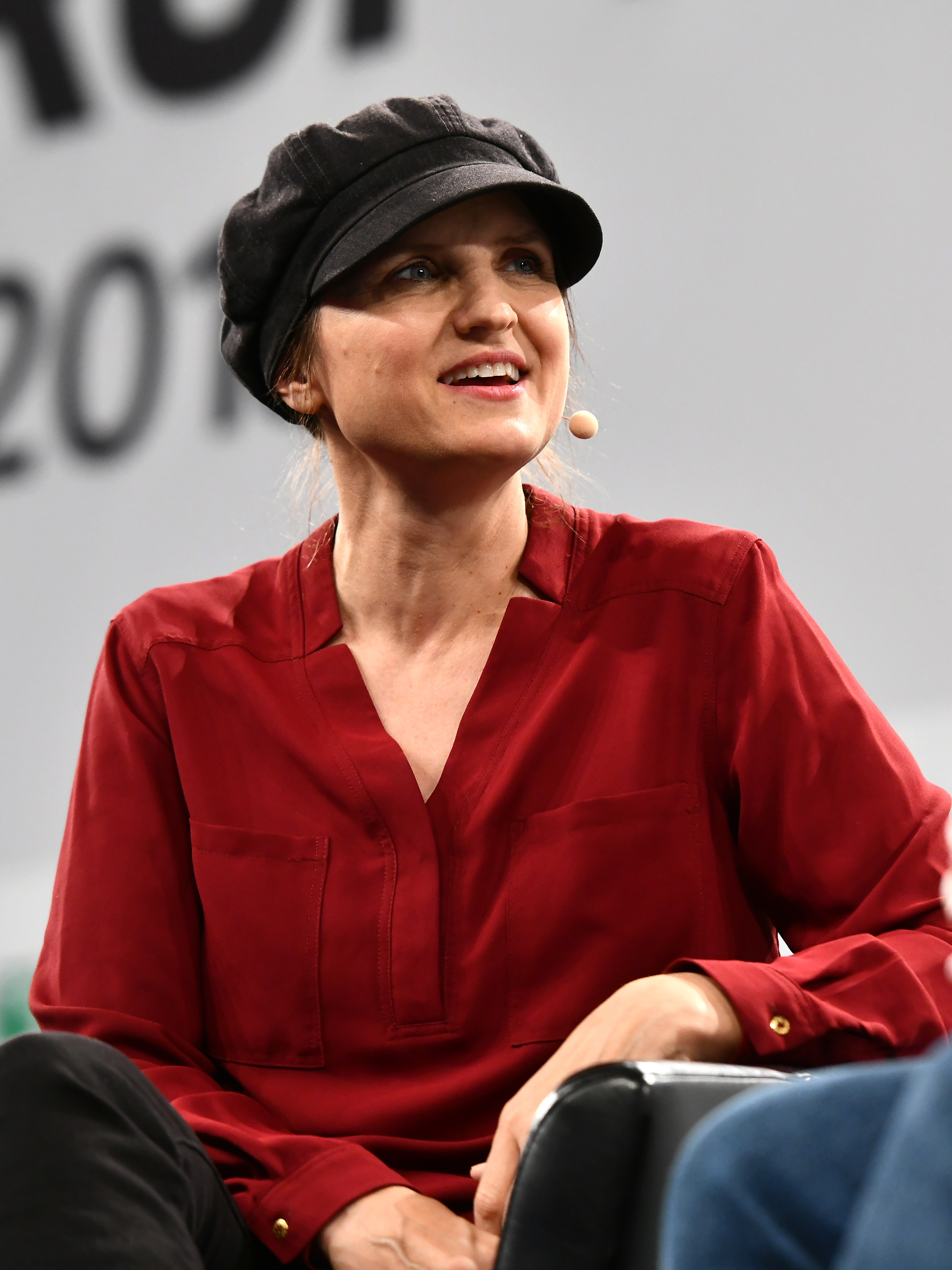
- Stina Ehrensvärd at TechCrunch Disrupt 2018 in Berlin
- Born: Stina Margareta Grip; July 11, 1967 (age 59); Seattle, Washington, U.S.
- Citizenship: Sweden; United States
- Education: Konstfack (Industrial Design)
- Occupations: Entrepreneur; Industrial designer
- Known for: Co-founding Yubico and co-inventing the YubiKey
- Title: Co-Founder and Chief Evangelist of Yubico
- Spouse: Jakob Ehrensvärd
- Children: 3
- Awards: Swedish Innovation Award (2014); KTH Great Prize (2016); EY World Entrepreneur Of The Year (2025)

Stina Ehrensvärd is a Swedish-American entrepreneur, innovator and industrial designer. She is the founder and Chief Evangelist of Yubico and co-inventor of the YubiKey authentication device.

== Biography ==
Ehrensvärd was born in the United States. Her father, who was an architect like her mother, spent a year at the University of Washington in Seattle, undertaking research on urban planning and computer graphics. The following year, the family moved back to Lund, Sweden, where she grew up with three siblings. She went on to study industrial design at the Konstfack University College of Arts, Crafts and Design in Stockholm. It was around this time that she met her husband-to-be Jakob Ehrensvärd, an electronics enthusiast. They now have three children.

The two began collaborating on a series of innovations combining their design and computing talents. Their first significant joint development was Cypak, an intelligent pharmaceutical packaging system that did not take off. In 2007, the couple founded Yubico, and began manufacturing the YubiKey authentication device for account logins. The YubiKey quickly gained worldwide popularity and attracted millions of users, including nine of the top ten internet companies. In 2011, the couple moved to Palo Alto to become part of the Silicon Valley IT scene.

Yubico is a leading contributor to the FIDO Universal 2nd Factor (U2F) open authentication standard (co-authored with Google), and invented the concept of having one authentication device access any number of online services with no shared secrets. Under Ehrensvärd's guidance, Yubico is the innovator behind driverless one-time password (OTP) authentication, PIV smart cards with touch-to-sign, and Hardware Security Modules that sit inside standard USB-ports.

Ehrensvärd also frequently speaks on internet identity and entrepreneurship. In 2013, she was listed in the monthly magazine Inc. as one of the "10 Women to Watch in Tech in 2013". The following year, Yubico was awarded the Swedish Innovation Award, and in 2016, she was awarded the KTH Great Prize, one of the most prestigious innovation and entrepreneur awards in Sweden.

In 2013, Ehrensvärd was interviewed by the business magazine The NextWomen about using the YubiKey for the first FIDO U2F pilot with Google. When asked if there was anything she wished to share with the community, she revealed: "We women are trained in our DNA to please. I have stopped trying to please everyone, but to instead follow my dreams."

Ehrensvärd's company, Yubico, is also a supporter of the Hong Kong protests, having donated 500 encryption keys to the activists.

In 2025, Ehrensvärd was recognized by Ernst and Young as their World Entrepreneur Of The Year.
