= Inter Milan =

Association football club in Italy

- Full name: Football Club Internazionale Milano S.p.A.
- Nicknames: I Nerazzurri (The Black and Blues); La Beneamata (The Well-Cherished One); Il Biscione (The Big Grass Snake)
- Short name: Inter; Inter Milan
- Founded: 9 March 1908; 118 years ago (as Football Club Internazionale)
- Stadium: San Siro
- Capacity: 75,817 (limited capacity); 80,018 (maximum capacity)
- Owners: Oaktree Capital Management (99.6%); Other shareholders (0.04%)
- President: Giuseppe Marotta
- Head coach: Cristian Chivu
- League: Serie A
- 2025–26: Serie A, 1st of 20 (champions)
- Website: www.inter.it
Home colours	Away colours	Third colours

Football Club Internazionale Milano, widely referred to in Italian as Internazionale (pronounced [internattsjoˈnaːle]) or simply Inter (Italian pronunciation: [ˈinter]), and commonly known as Inter Milan in English-speaking countries, is an Italian professional football club based in Milan, Lombardy. Inter is the only team to have an unbroken presence in the top division of Italian football, currently Serie A, since its debut in 1909, having never been relegated to Serie B. Since 1947, Inter has shared the San Siro stadium, the largest stadium in Italy, with AC Milan, with whom it contests the long-standing Derby della Madonnina, one of the most widely followed rivalries in world football.

The club was founded on 9 March 1908 after a split within the Milan Foot-Ball and Cricket Club (now AC Milan), and won its first championship in 1910. Since its formation, the club has won 39 domestic trophies, including 21 league titles, 10 Coppa Italia, and 8 Supercoppa Italiana. From 2006 to 2010, the club won five successive league titles, equaling the all-time record at that time. It has won the European Cup/Champions League three times. Its latest win in 2010 completed an unprecedented Italian seasonal treble, with Inter also winning the Serie A title and the Coppa Italia in the same year. The club has also won three UEFA Cups, two Intercontinental Cups, and one FIFA Club World Cup.

Inter has the highest home game attendance in Italy and the fourth-highest attendance in Europe. Since May 2024, the club has been owned by American asset management company Oaktree Capital Management.

== History ==
=== Foundation and early years (1908–1960) ===
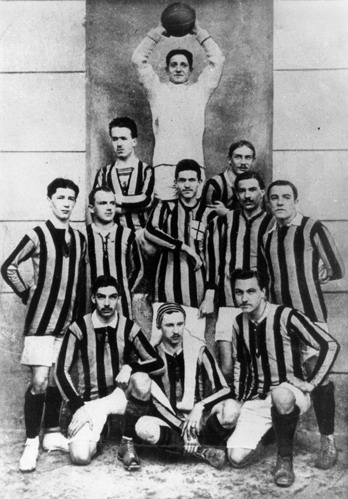
Inter squad in 1910

"Questa notte splendida darà i colori al nostro stemma: il nero e l'azzurro sullo sfondo d'oro delle stelle. Si chiamerà Internazionale, perché noi siamo fratelli del mondo."

— Giorgio Muggiani, 9 March 1908, Milan

"This wonderful night will give us the colours of our crest: black and blue against a backdrop of stars. It shall be called International, because we are brothers of the world."

— Giorgio Muggiani, 9 March 1908, Milan

The club was founded on 9 March 1908 as Football Club Internazionale, when a group of players left the Milan Cricket and Football Club (now AC Milan) to form a new club because they wanted to accept more foreign players. The name of the club derives from the wish of its founding members to accept foreign players as well as Italians. The club won its first championship in 1910 and its second in 1920. The captain and coach of the first championship winning team was Virgilio Fossati, who was later killed in battle while serving in the Italian army during World War I.

In 1922, Inter was at risk of relegation to the Second Division of Northern League, but they remained in the top league after winning two play-offs.

Six years later, during the Fascist era, the club merged with the Unione Sportiva Milanese and, for political reasons, was renamed Società Sportiva Ambrosiana. During the 1928–29 season, the team wore white jerseys with a red cross emblazoned on it; the jersey's design was inspired by the flag and coat of arms of the city of Milan. In 1929, the new club chairman Oreste Simonotti changed the club's name to Associazione Sportiva Ambrosiana and restored the previous black-and-blue jerseys; however, supporters continued to call the team Inter, and in 1931, new chairman Pozzani succumbed to shareholder pressure and changed the name to Associazione Sportiva Ambrosiana-Inter.

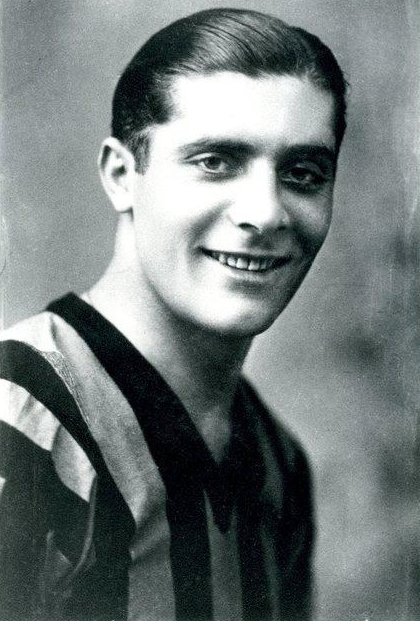
Giuseppe Meazza still holds the record for the most goals scored in a debut season in Serie A, with 31 goals in his first season (1929–30).

Inter won its third championship titles in 1930 with the Hungarian coach Arpad Weisz in the first ever edition of Serie A, and the fourth in 1938 with former player Armando Castellazzi as a 33 years old coach, that set the record for the youngest coach ever to win the national title that lasts to this day. Inter also got their first Coppa Italia (Italian Cup) in 1939 with the decisive goal in the final scored by Olympic gold medal and top scorer in 1936 Olympics Annibale Frossi. Inter's main star and the captain of the team in this period was Giuseppe Meazza, one of the greatest Italian players of all time with two World Cups won with the National team and the greatest scorer in Inter history with 284 goals, and after whom the San Siro stadium is officially named after his death in 1980. 38 goals scored by Meazza in 39 matches in 1929-1930 is a seasonal record in Inter history still unbeaten today. Inter ended also three consecutive times in 2nd place between 1933 and 1935; in those years many South Americans of Italian origin arrived in Milan to circumvent the regime's rules that prohibit the hiring of foreign players: Uruguayan players like World Cup Winner in 1930 Hector Scarone and Ernesto Mascheroni and also Ricardo Faccio and Francesco Frione, and Argentinian like Attilio Demaría that stayed 10 seasons with the club. A fifth championship followed in 1940, that ended a decade dominated by three teams: Inter, Bologna and the historic rival Juventus, while AC Milan didn't win a title for 44 years from 1907 to 1951 and didn't win a single derby for a record 17 matches from 1928 to 1938.

In the 1930s Inter also played for seven times in one of the first major European football cups, the Central European Cup, with Meazza that was a record three times topscorer of the competition; coached by Árpád Weisz Inter reached the final in 1933, when after had won the first leg in Milan 2–1, lost 3–1 in 9 men against Austria Vienna. 4 out of 11 players of that team: Meazza, Luigi Allemandi, Attilio Demaría and Armando Castellazzi would go on to win the 1934 World Cup with Italian national team, while other five Inter players will contribute to the win of 1938 World Cup with Italy: Meazza, Ugo Locatelli, Giovanni Ferrari, Pietro Ferraris and Renato Olmi.

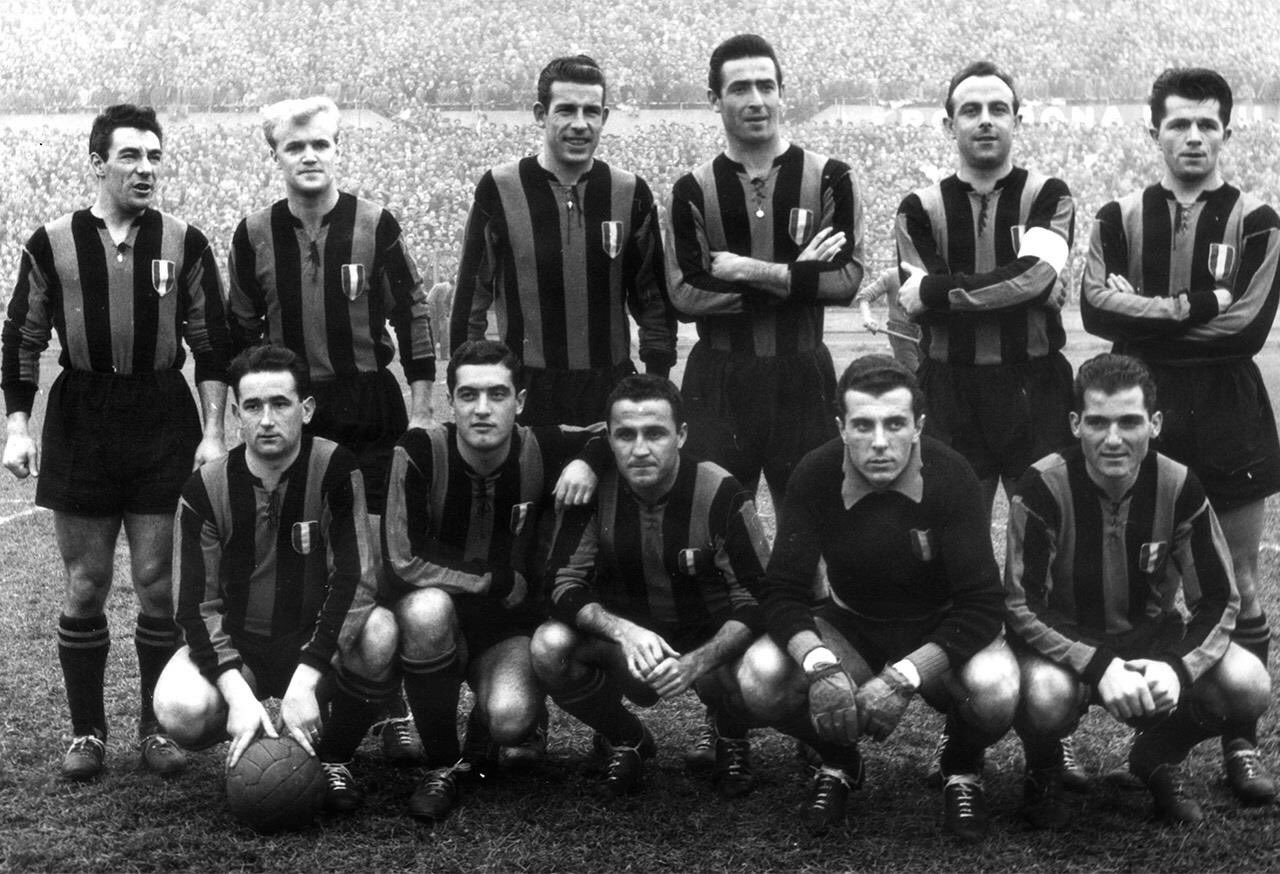
A line-up of Inter in the 1953–54 season. From left to right, standing: Benito Lorenzi, Lennart Skoglund, Fulvio Nesti, Bruno Mazza, Attilio Giovannini (captain), István Nyers; crouched: Bruno Padulazzi, Gino Armano, Maino Neri, Giorgio Ghezzi, Giovanni Giacomazzi.

After the end of World War II, the club's name changed back to its original one, Internazionale, and it come close to win Serie A title in two occasions, one in the last season of Grande Torino in 1949, against whom Inter were the last team to face them on 30 April 1949 five days before the Superga air disaster, and in 1951 for just one point, with the contribution of great players acquired by president Carlo Masseroni in these years, like Gino Armano, Amedeo Amadei, the first Dutch player in club history Faas Wilkes and the Hungarian István Nyers from Stade Français; Inter will win its sixth championship in 1953 and its seventh in 1954, for the first time in two consecutive years, coached by Alfredo Foni and led by two of the most prolific strikers in club history: István Nyers and Benito Lorenzi with the Swedish Lennart Skoglund that completed the offensive trio. One of the crucial matches of the 1954 Scudetto was the direct clash for the title, that saw Inter victory over Juventus for 6-0, the club's biggest victory in the Derby d'Italia.

In May 1955, Angelo Moratti became the new owner of Inter, and in the first years of his presidency got disappointing results despite strong players like forwards, Eddie Firmani and the Argentinian Angelillo who scored an all-time record in a season in Serie A with 18 teams: 33 goals in 33 matches in 1958-1959 season, tied also Meazza seasonal record of 38 goals in 39 matches.

Moratti in the following years put foundations to one of the greatest teams in football history starting from the debut of a 16 years old Mario Corso and the acquisition of Aristide Guarneri in 1958, and under Argentinian coach Helenio Herrera in 1960 with the signing of Giacinto Facchetti and Armando Picchi.

=== Grande Inter (1960–1967) ===
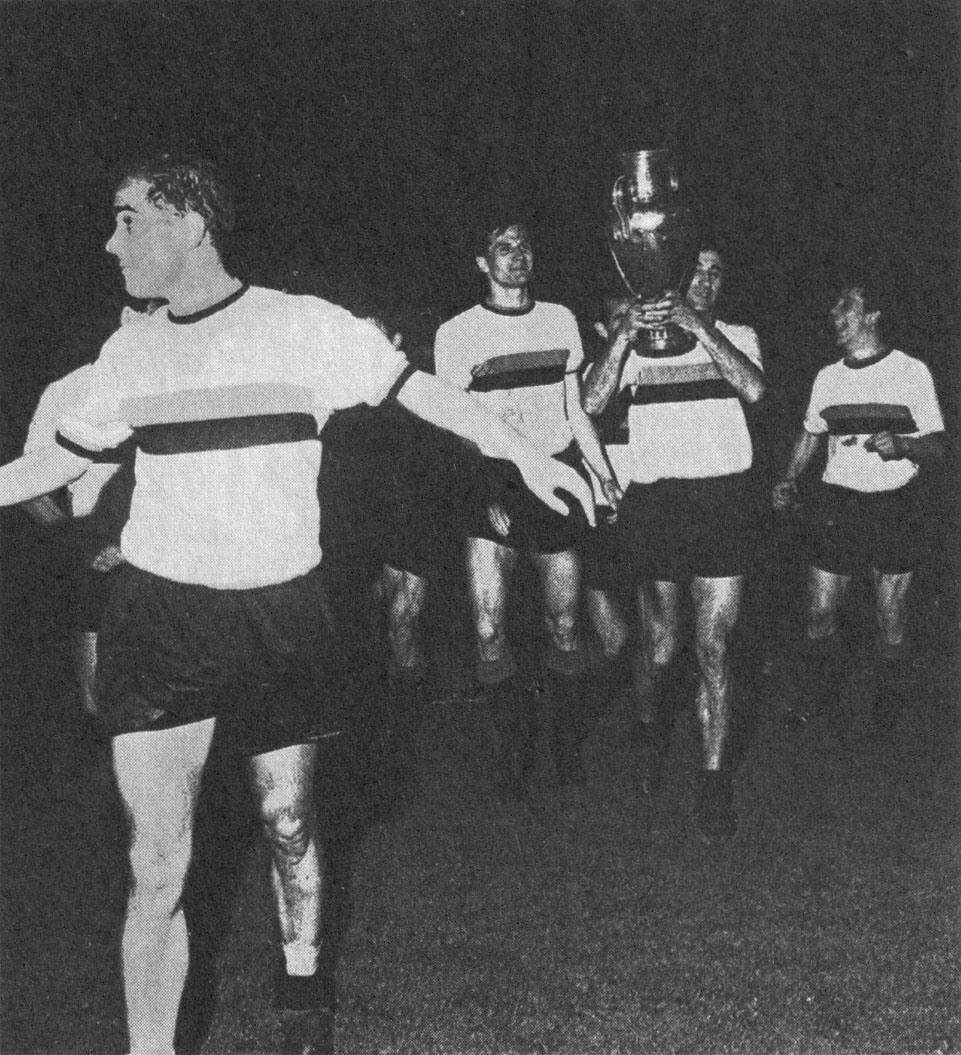
Luis Suárez, Giacinto Facchetti, Joaquín Peiró and Gianfranco Bedin with 1965 European Cup trophy

In 1960, manager Helenio Herrera joined Inter from Barcelona and in his first season as a coach in Milan, after having led the table for most of the season, lost the title in the last games of the season, with the infamous episode during Juventus–Inter held in Turin in April 1961 when the match was stopped after 30 minutes when Juventus supporters invaded the pitch, with Inter being awarded the game 2–0. Then, after two months, in June before the last decisive match of Serie A with the two teams tied in first place, the Italian Football Federation, presided by Juventus president Umberto Agnelli, decided that the match between the two teams had to be replayed after the last game scheduled for the season; with Inter loss and a draw for Juventus, the following match became useless and in open contestation Angelo Moratti ordered Herrera to put the Inter youth team against the Turinese squad: the match ended 9–1 for Juventus, with the only goal scored for Inter by an 18-year-old, the son of Valentino Mazzola, Sandro Mazzola who later would become one of the greatest legends in the history of the club.

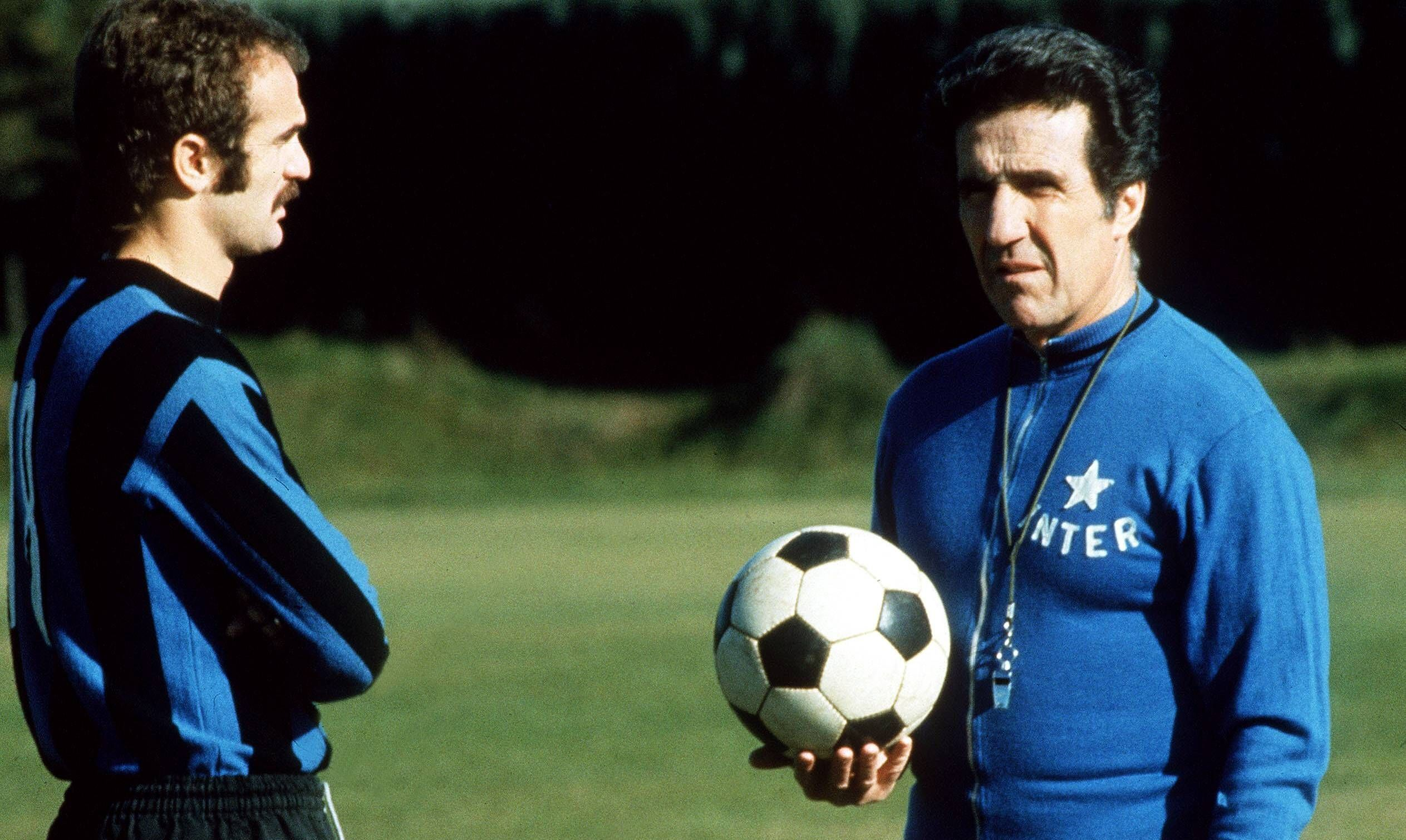
Helenio Herrera, the most successful coach in club's history, guided Inter for a record 9 seasons

After his first season in Milan, Herrera brought with him for a record fee of 25 million pesetas Spanish midfielder Luis Suárez who won the European Footballer of the Year in 1960 for his role in Barcelona's La Liga/Fairs Cup double. Herrera would transform Inter into one of the leading teams in Europe that would win three Serie A titles in four years, two European Cups and two Intercontinental Cups in a row. He modified a 5–3–2 tactic known as the "Verrou" ("door bolt"), which created greater flexibility for counterattacks. The catenaccio system was invented by an Austrian coach, Karl Rappan. Rappan's original system was implemented with four fixed defenders, playing a strict man-to-man marking system, plus a playmaker in the middle of the field, who plays the ball together with two midfield wings. Herrera would modify it by adding a fifth defender, the sweeper or libero, behind the two centre backs. The sweeper or libero, who acted as the free man, would deal with any attackers who went through the two centre backs. Inter finished third in the Serie A in his first season, second the next year and first in his third season. Then followed a back-to-back European Cup victory in 1964 and 1965, earning him the title "il Mago" ("the Wizard"). The core of Herrera's team were the goalkeeper Giuliano Sarti, the full-backs Tarcisio Burgnich and Giacinto Facchetti, Armando Picchi the sweeper, Suárez the playmaker, the Brazilian Jair the right winger, Mario Corso the left winger and Sandro Mazzola, who played on the inside-right.

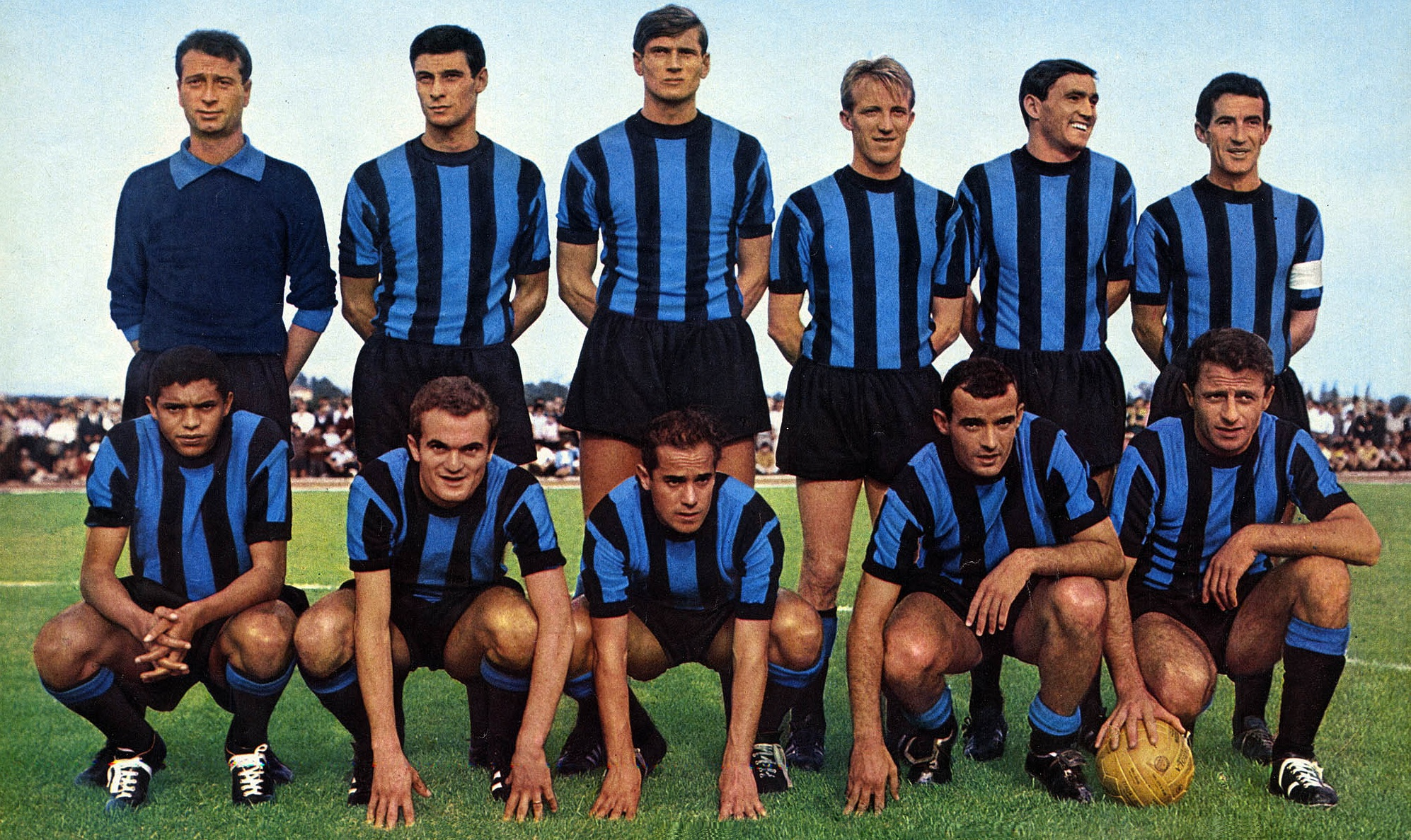
La "Grande Inter" in 1964–1965 season standing from left to right: Sarti, Guarneri, Facchetti, Tagnin, Burgnich, Picchi (c). Front row from left to right: Jair, Mazzola, Suárez, Corso, Milani.

After the Serie A title won in the previous season, in 1964 Inter reached the European Cup Final by beating Borussia Dortmund in the semi-final and Partizan in the quarter-final. In the final in Praterstadion, Vienna, they met Real Madrid, a team that had reached seven out of the nine finals to date. Mazzola scored two goals and one from Milani in a 3–1 victory, becoming also the first ever team to win the tournament without losing a single game.

The team also won the Intercontinental Cup; after having lost the first match in Argentine against Independiente 1–0, Inter won second leg 2–0 in San Siro with goals from Mazzola and Corso, in the third decisive match played at the Santiago Bernabeu, Inter won in extra-time with a goal from Mario Corso, the first Italian club to win the trophy and become club world champion.

In 1964, Inter added other important players Angelo Domenghini, Gianfranco Bedin and another Spanish Joaquín Peiró, who played with consistency and was decisive in European Cup where three foreign players could play at the same time, while in Serie A only two were allowed to play.

1965 European Cup Final starting lineup vs. Benfica

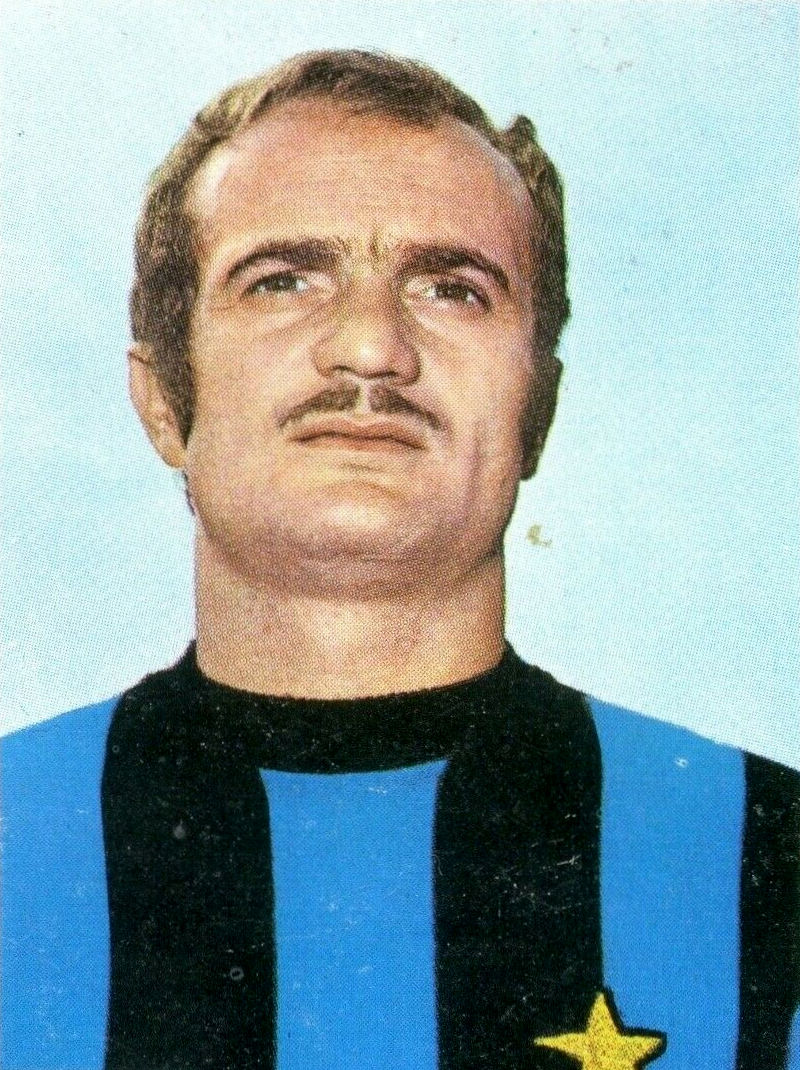
Sandro Mazzola played for the highly successful Inter team remembered by the name of "La Grande Inter" in the 1960s, he spent all of his 17 career seasons from 1960 to 1977 with Inter shirt.

A year later, after have defeated Liverpool in the semi-final second leg 3–0 recovering from a 3–1 defeat at Anfield, with Facchetti scoring the decisive goal, Inter repeated the feat by beating two-time winner Benfica in the final held at home, from a Jair goal, and then again beat Independiente in the Intercontinental Cup with a 3–0 win in San Siro, with two goals from Mazzola and one from Peirò, and a draw in Argentine, becoming the first European team to win two times in a row the competition. Inter came close to winning the Treble for the first time in European football history that year, after having also won the Serie A title, but lost the Coppa Italia final against Juventus in a game played in the last days of August 1965.

Facchetti was voted second in 1965 Ballon d'Or rankings, just missing out the chance to become the first defender to win the award.

Inter again reached semi-finals of the European cup in 1966, but this time lost against a Real Madrid team that would go on to win the tournament, while in national championship Herrera's squad won the tenth scudetto in club history, the first Star.

At the end of the season, Moratti signed two of the greatest players of all time: Franz Beckenbauer and Eusebio; but, after 1966 World Cup when Italian National Team was eliminated by North Korea, the Italian Federation decided to block new signings of foreign players, a ban which lasted until 1980; thus, the contracts with the two players were cancelled.

In 1967, after Inter eliminated Real Madrid in quarter-finals, with Suárez and Jair injured, Inter lost the European Cup final in Lisbon 2–1 to Celtic; a week later, despite the first position, with a lost against Mantova in the last match of the championship, Inter lost also the Serie A title and, a week later, the Coppa Italia semi-final against Padova, putting an end de facto to the Grande Inter cicle with the first season without trophy since 1961–1962. During that year, the club changed its name to Football Club Internazionale Milano, and in 1968 after 13 years Angelo Moratti sold the team to Ivanoe Fraizzoli, and also Helenio Herrera left the team.

=== Subsequent achievements (1967–1991) ===
Facchetti, captain of Italian National team for an all-time record of 11 years, Burnich and Guarneri formed also the defence of Italy that won UEFA Euro 1968 with Mazzola and Domenghini, and that with the addition of Inter players Roberto Boninsegna and Mario Bertini also reached final of 1970 World Cup against Brazil, tournament known also for the famous semifinal match, the so-called "Game of the Century" against West Germany.

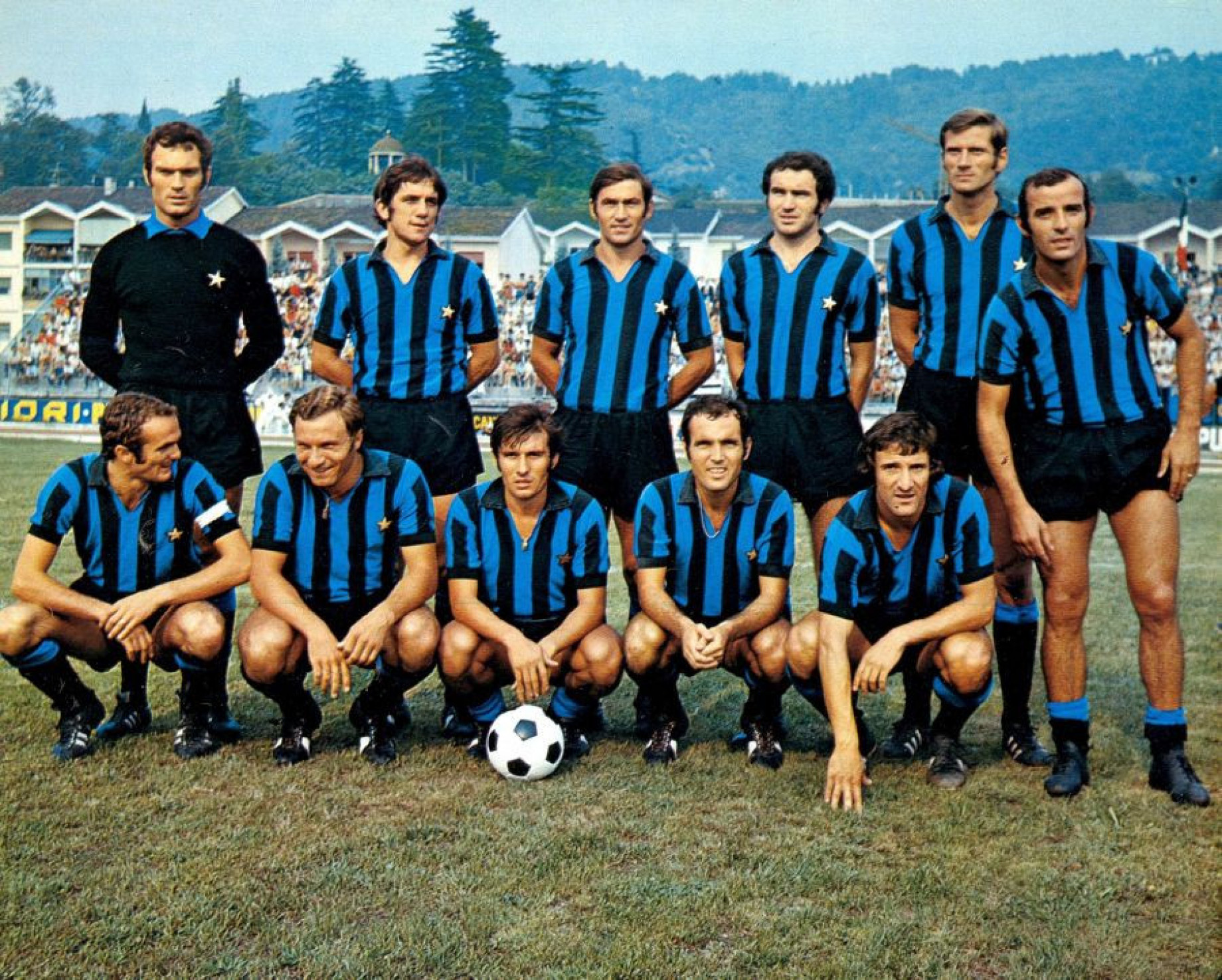
A line-up of F.C. Internazionale Milano during the Scudetto winning 1970–71 season

Following the golden era of the 1960s, Inter managed to win their eleventh league title in 1971 under the coach Giovanni Invernizzi who took over the job during the season with the team that made a great comeback after have had a difficult start, with 23 consecutive matches without a loss, with Roberto Boninsegna, one of the greatest strikers in club history, who led the league with 24 goals in that seasons and repeated the feat the following season with 22. Inter reached for the second time in five years the European Cup final in 1972 after have defetead Borussia Mönchengladbach, Standard Liège and Celtic in the semi-final, with a team which still featured Facchetti, Mazzola, Burnich, Jair, Bedin and Corso (the latter who could not play in the remain matches of the competition for disqualification after the red card at the end of the first match against Mönchengladbach) and also a young Gabriele Oriali. The final held in Rotterdam saw the victory for 2–0 of Johan Cruyff's Ajax that won the trophy for the second consecutive season.

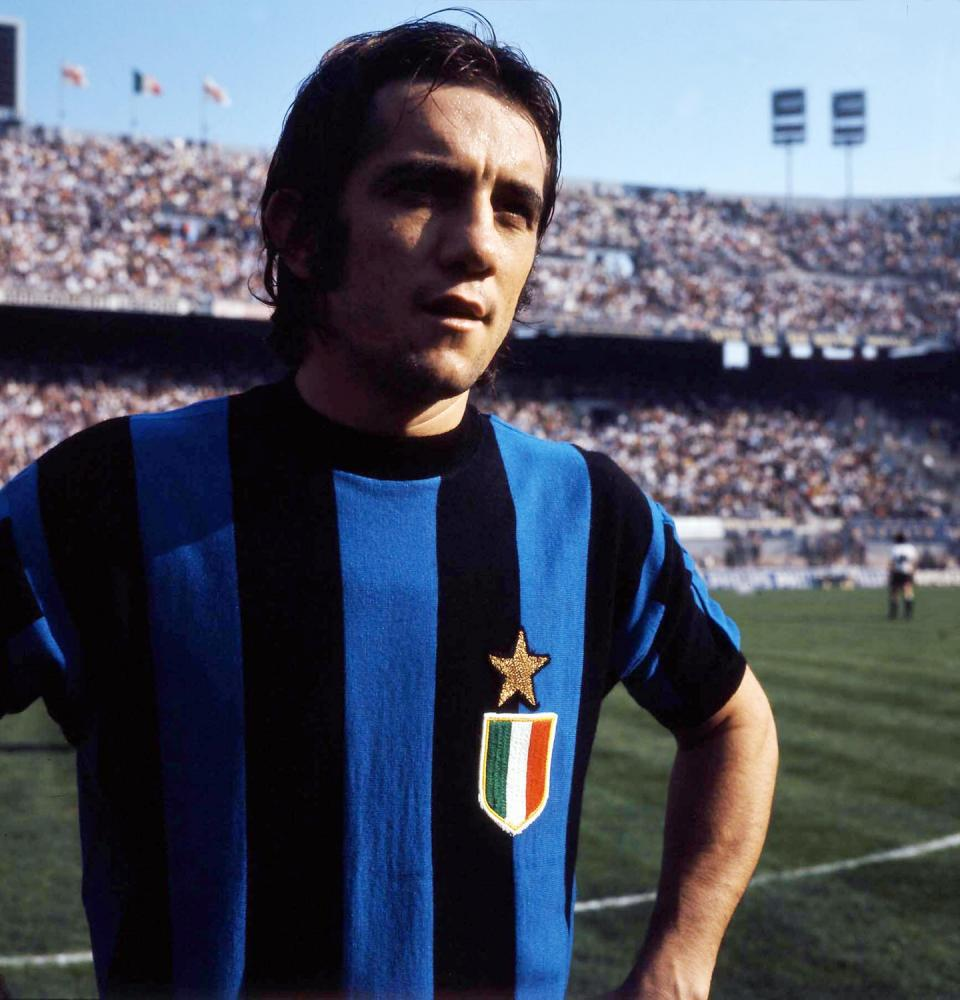
Roberto Boninsegna scored 173 goals in 285 matches for Inter, still holds the all-time Serie A record of 19 consecutive penalties scored

The return of Helenio Herrera in 1973 as Inter coach lasted only 16 matches, for a heart attack that obliged him to leave the coaching job. Mazzola retired in 1977 and Facchetti, the last member of La Grande Inter, retired in 1978 as the most prolific defender in the history of Serie A with 59 goals scored and after having won the last trophy of his career, the Coppa Italia.

Inter won their twelfth scudetto in 1980, the last one won in the history of Serie A by a team composed entirely of Italian players, and also added two to its Coppa Italia tally, in 1977–78 (with the future captain Graziano Bini who scored the decisive goal in the final against Napoli) and in 1981–82, both under coach Eugenio Bersellini. Alessandro Altobelli, who later became the all-time leading scorer in Coppa Italia and in International competition for the club and played for Inter for 11 seasons, scored 209 goals, second only to Giuseppe Meazza. Altobelli also scored three goals against Juventus in a 4-0 victory on 11 November 1979, a feat which was repeated again five years later on the same day on 11 November 1984, with the same result, this time with the first two goals in Serie A for Karl-Heinz Rummenigge.

In this period, AC Milan were relegated two times in Serie B, the first time in 1980 for implications involved in the Totonero scandal and then again after the team ended its 1981–82 campaign in third-last place.

In 1981, Inter reached for the sixth time in six participations the semi-final of the European Cup, this time against Real Madrid, a classic match, and who they would encounter again in three different European competitions throughout the 1980s: in UEFA Cup Winners' Cup quarter-finals in 1983 and in Uefa Cup semi-finals in 1985 and 1986.

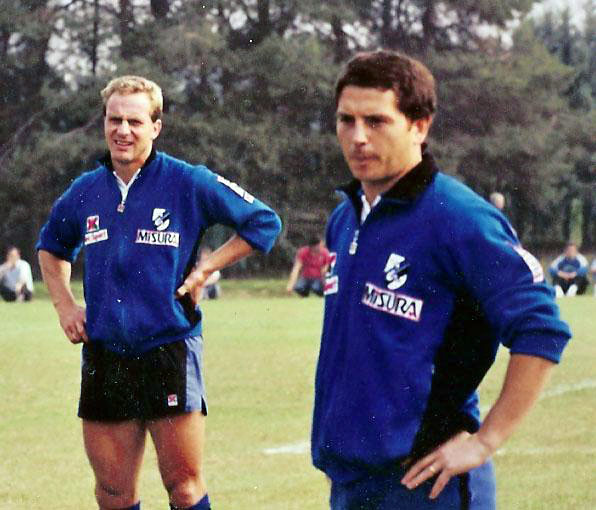
Karl-Heinz Rummenigge considered one of the greatest player in the world and one of the five Germans who played for Inter in the 1980s

Giuseppe Bergomi, the youngest player to make his professional debut in first team in the history of the club at 16 years old, one month and eight days in January 1980, remained at Inter for all his career for a record 20 seasons, till the end of 1998-1999 season. Bergomi with Oriali, Altobelli, Gianpiero Marini and Ivano Bordon were part of Italy squad that won 1982 FIFA World Cup.

The Italian federation reopened the possibility to sign foreign players in 1980; in the following years, Inter signed among others: Herbert Prohaska, Hansi Müller from VfB Stuttgart, two times Ballon d'Or winner Karl-Heinz Rummenigge from Bayern Munich (who formed a deadly duo with Altobelli), Liam Brady and Argentinian Daniel Passarella. Other important players in that time were Italians Walter Zenga (voted as World's Best Goalkeeper by IFFHS for three years in a row in 1989, 1990 and 1991) and the defenders Giuseppe Baresi, Bergomi and Riccardo Ferri.

Led by the German duo of Andreas Brehme and Lothar Matthäus, with Aldo Serena top scorer in Serie A with 22 goals, Argentinian Ramón Díaz and Nicola Berti, Inter, coached by Giovanni Trapattoni, captured the 1989 Serie A championship setting many record, the so called "Scudetto dei Record": ended with an all-time record for most points in Serie A history with 18 teams with 58 points out of 68, 26 victories out of 34 matches, the best offence and the best defence, with an 11 point margin over Maradona's Napoli and 12 point margin over AC Milan, coached by Sacchi (with two points per victory, rule that lasted until the end of 1993-1994 season). Inter were unable to defend their title in the following season in a very competitive Serie A that saw six different teams win in seven years, and despite adding fellow German Jürgen Klinsmann to the squad and winning their first Supercoppa Italiana at the start of the season.

=== Mixed fortunes (1991–2004) ===
The 1990s were disappointing years in terms of victories, while their great rivals, Milan and Juventus, achieved successes mainly at a domestic level in Serie A, and also winning the renamed UEFA Champions League once each. Inter enjoyed little success in the domestic league standings, their worst coming in 1993–94 when they finished in thirteenth position, just one point above the relegation zone. Nevertheless, they achieved prestigious European success, with three UEFA Cup victories out of four finals, in 1991, 1994 and 1998.

After the win of 1990 World Cup of West Germany led by three Inter players, Matthäus was awarded the Ballon d'Or and ended 1990–1991, his most prolific in career, with 23 goals, including six in 1991 UEFA Cup, the first European trophy since the Grande Inter period; Trapattoni left the team after five seasons. At the end of 1991, Matthäus also won the first ever FIFA World Player of the Year.

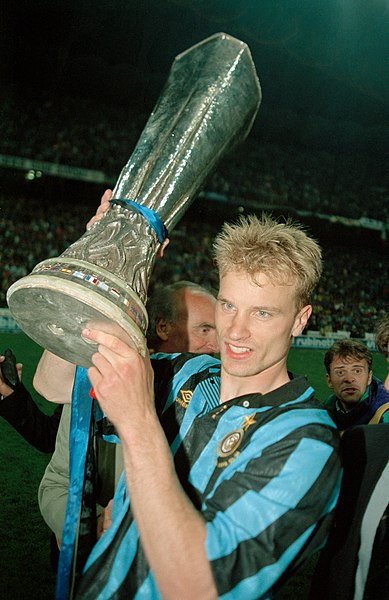
Dennis Bergkamp after winning the 1994 UEFA Cup.

In 1992, after a disappointing season, to replace the three German players that left in the summer and with the new coach Osvaldo Bagnoli, Inter signed important players like the future Ballon d'Or winner Matthias Sammer, Rubén Sosa and Igor Shalimov, the first Russian player in club history; others were ultimately less successful, like the former European Golden Boot winner Darko Pancev and Salvatore Schillaci; Inter ended the season in second place behind AC Milan, coached by Fabio Capello. In the following season, Inter acquired from Ajax Wim Jonk and Dennis Bergkamp, the latter who with eight goals in the competition led Inter to their second UEFA Cup victory in 1994, despite the worst result in club history in Serie A.

With Massimo Moratti's takeover from Ernesto Pellegrini in 1995, Inter twice broke the world record transfer fee in this period (£19.5 million for Ronaldo from Barcelona in 1997 and £31 million for Christian Vieri from Lazio two years later). Among Moratti's first acquisitions in 1995 there were Javier Zanetti from Banfield, who would stay at Inter until 2014 with a record of 858 game played and with a record 13 seasons as captain, Paul Ince from Manchester United and Roberto Carlos from Palmeiras, who was sold the following season to Real Madrid, with many regrets and recriminations from fans. However, the 1990s remained the only decade in Inter's history in which they did not win a single Serie A championship. This persistent lack of success led to poor relations between the fanbase and the chairman, the managers and even some individual players.

In the 1996–97 season, Inter reached a third UEFA Cup final, losing this time on penalties in the second leg at the Giuseppe Meazza against Schalke 04, with Roy Hodgson resigning shortly afterwards. In the 1997–98 season, with the acquisition of the European Golden Shoe and later Ballon d'Or and FIFA World Player of the Year winner Ronaldo, under coach Luigi Simoni, Inter had won their third UEFA Cup in Paris, beating Lazio 3–0, with goals from Ivan Zamorano, Zanetti and Ronaldo, and nearly won Serie A title, with many controversial refereeing decisions. This culminated in the decisive match against Juventus in Turin, with Inter only one point behind with four games left, when referee didn't give a penalty to Ronaldo, but a few seconds later, gave a penalty to Juventus; this generated a turmoil on the pitch and a big scandal. The referee sent off Simoni, and president Moratti left the building shortly afterwards, saying to journalists: "I'm not sticking around just to be made fun of". At the end of 1998, Inter was ranked by IFFHS as Best Club in the World for that year.

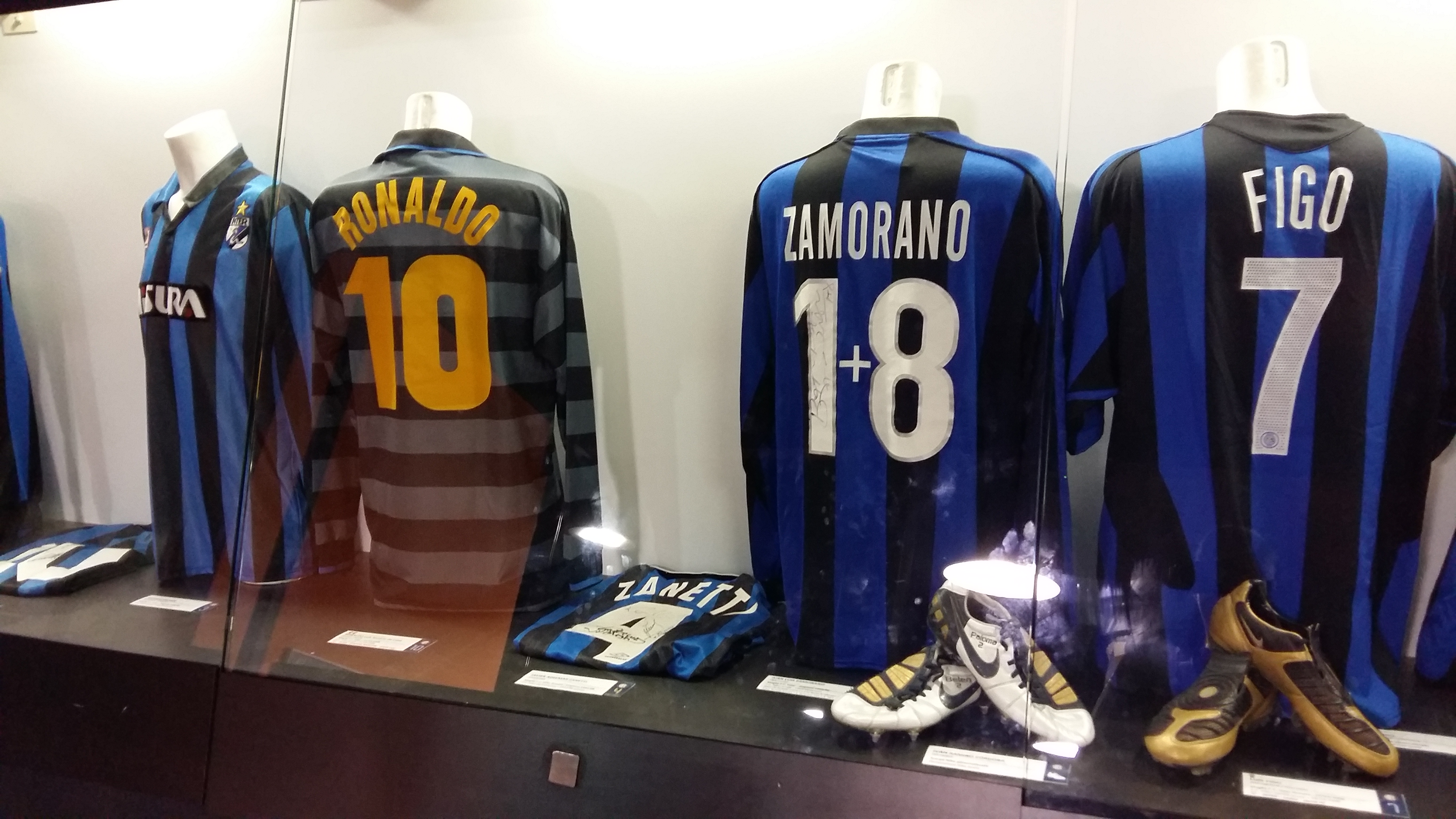
Jerseys of Ronaldo (number 10), Zamorano (1+8), Figo (7) and Lothar Matthäus (10) and Javier Zanetti (4) are displayed at San Siro.

Moratti later became a target of the fans, especially when he sacked the much-loved coach Simoni after a few games into the 1998–99 season, five days after Inter defeated Real Madrid 3–1 at San Siro in Champions League group stage, with two goals from Roberto Baggio, and having just received the Italian manager of the year award for 1998 the day before being dismissed. That season, despite four coaching changes, Inter reached the Champions League quarter-finals, where they were eliminated by Manchester United, who would go on to win the trophy that year; Inter failed to qualify for any European competition for the first time in seven years, finishing in eighth place.

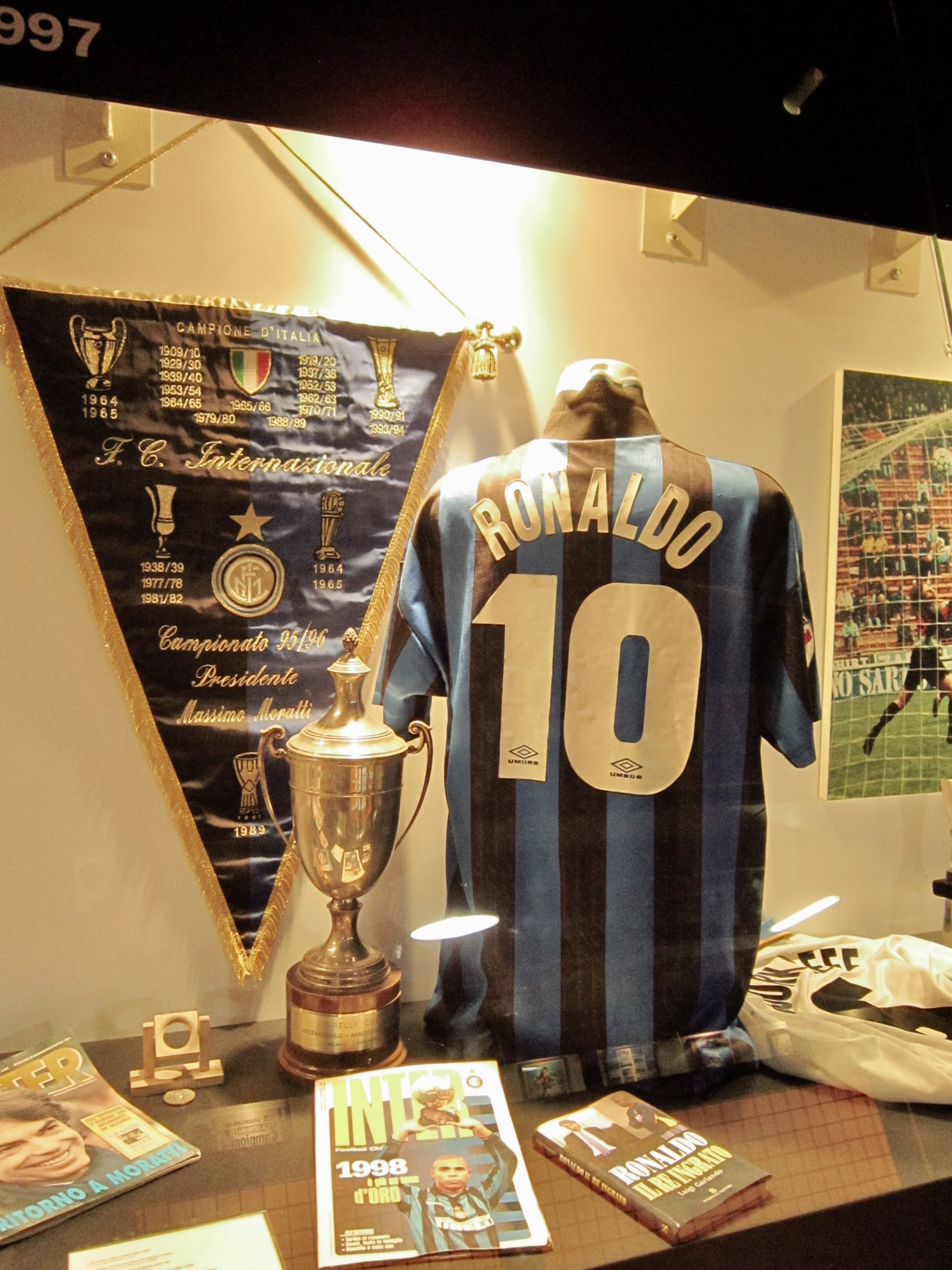
Ronaldo's first season with Inter concluded with 34 goals scored in 47 matches.

The following season, in 1999–2000, Moratti appointed former Juventus manager Marcello Lippi, and signed players such as Angelo Peruzzi, Laurent Blanc, Iván Córdoba, Clarence Seedorf from Real Madrid and also Vieri and Jugović; he also sold other important players, like Diego Simeone, Youri Djorkaeff, Aron Winter and Gianluca Pagliuca. The team came close to their first domestic success since 1989 when they reached the Coppa Italia final, only to be defeated by Lazio, in a match remembered for the second severe injury to the right knee of Ronaldo, who was returning after five months of inactivity, and which would keep him out for more than a year and a half.

Inter's misfortunes continued the following season, losing the 2000 Supercoppa Italiana match against Lazio 4–3, after initially taking the lead through new signing Robbie Keane. They were also eliminated in the preliminary round of the Champions League by Swedish club Helsingborg, with Álvaro Recoba missing a crucial late penalty. Lippi was sacked after only a single game of the new season, following Inter's first-ever Serie A defeat to Reggina. Marco Tardelli, chosen to replace Lippi, failed to improve results and is remembered by Inter fans as the manager who lost 6–0 in the city derby against a weak AC Milan, who finished the season in sixth place behind Inter, who finished in fifth.

After the unfortunate decision to sell Andrea Pirlo to rival AC Milan in the summer of 2001 for 35 billion Italian lira, in the next season with new coach Hector Cuper, the acquisition of Francesco Toldo (the second most expensive goalkeeper in the world at that time), Marco Materazzi and the return after injury of Ronaldo to partner Vieri (a 'dream pairing' that played only 11 matches for a total of 667 minutes in three years, scoring 18 goals), not only did Inter manage to make it to the UEFA Cup semi-finals, but were also only 45 minutes away from capturing the Scudetto when they needed to maintain their one-goal advantage away to Lazio. Inter were 2–1 up after only 24 minutes. Lazio equalised during first half injury time, and then scored two more goals by Simeone and Simone Inzaghi in the second half to secure victory that saw Juventus win the championship, Roma ended second and Inter third. After brilliant performances and having won 2002 World Cup with Brazil, Ronaldo demanded to be sold to Real Madrid for €45 million, and was replaced by Hernan Crespo from Lazio for €40 million. Seedorf was sold to AC Milan and Fabio Cannavaro was acquired from Parma.

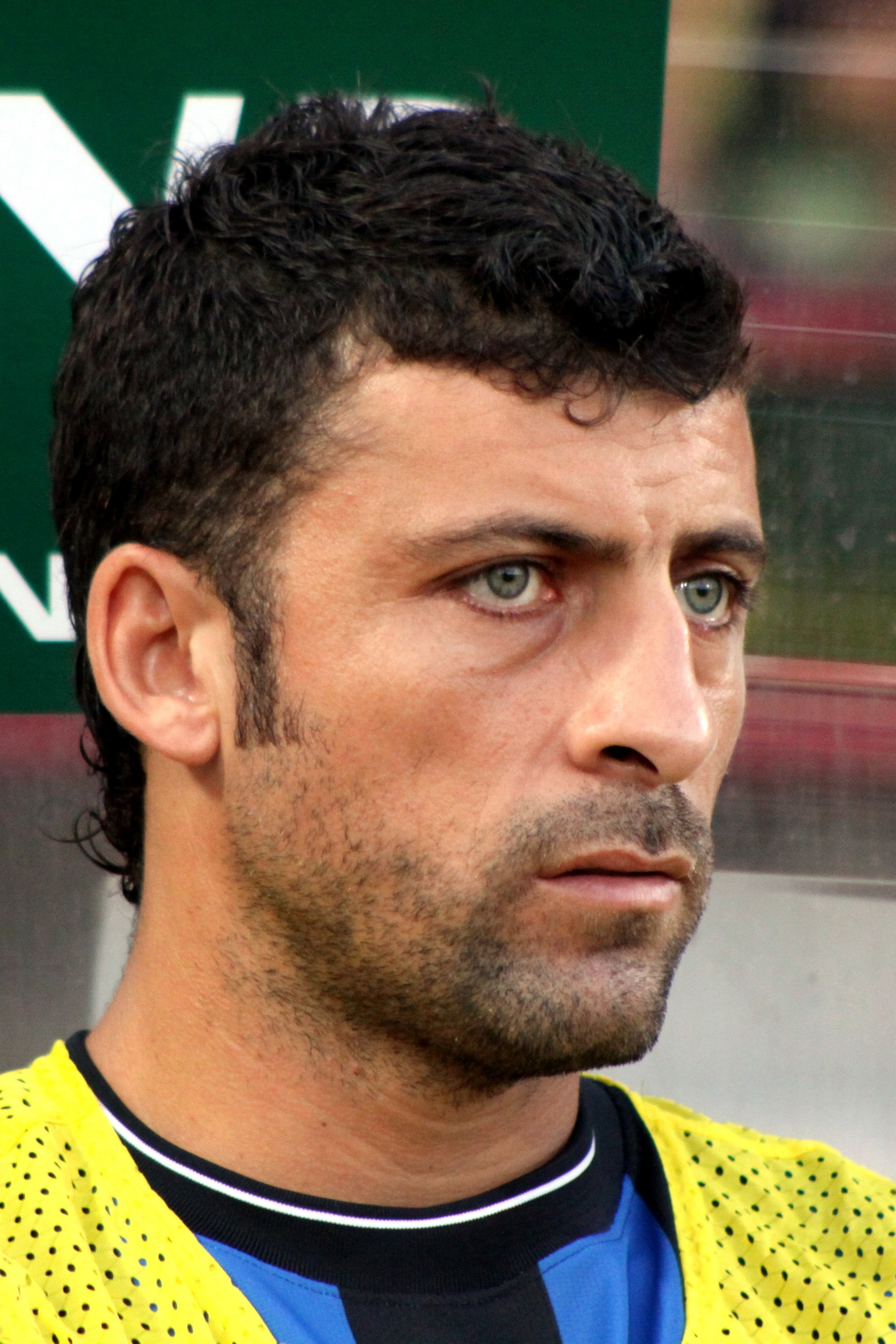
Walter Samuel, "The Wall", played for Inter from 2005 to 2014. He won all of the first 10 Derby di Milano fixtures he played in Serie A between 2005 and 2012.

The next season, Inter finished as league runners-up, with Vieri the top scorer of Serie A with 24 goals in 23 matches, while Crespo set a new record for UCL Group stage with eight goals in six matches, but missed almost the rest of the season for a severe injury in January. In October 2002, in a home game against Lyon, Inter was defeated for the first time in its history at home in the European Cup/UEFA Champions League, ending a run of 33 matches in 39 years. Inter reached the 2002–03 Champions League semi-finals against AC Milan, that were played also without the injured Vieri, and was eliminated on the away goals rule with two draws in the same stadium, the San Siro. After only one season, Crespo was sold to Chelsea for €26 million and was replaced by Julio Cruz from Bologna for €9.5 million.

The 2003–04 season started well, with an historic win for Inter and for Italian football in the Champions League at Highbury against Arsenal of Invincibles with a 3–0 victory, as well as a win against Dinamo Kyiv; but, after a draw against Brescia in Serie A, in October coach Cuper was sacked and was replaced by Alberto Zaccheroni, who couldn't help to avoid the elimination from the Champions League group stage. Despite acquisition in January of strong players like Dejan Stankovic and Adriano, Inter ultimately finished only in fourth place in Serie A. Other members of the Inter "family" during this period who "suffered" were the likes of Vieri and Cannavaro, both of whom had their restaurants in Milan vandalised after the second defeats of the season to the Rossoneri 3–2 in February 2004 in Serie A; but the most important was the resignation from presidency by Massimo Moratti in favour of Giacinto Facchetti in January 2004, that lasted until the premature death of Inter legend in September 2006.

=== Comeback and unprecedented treble (2004–2011) ===
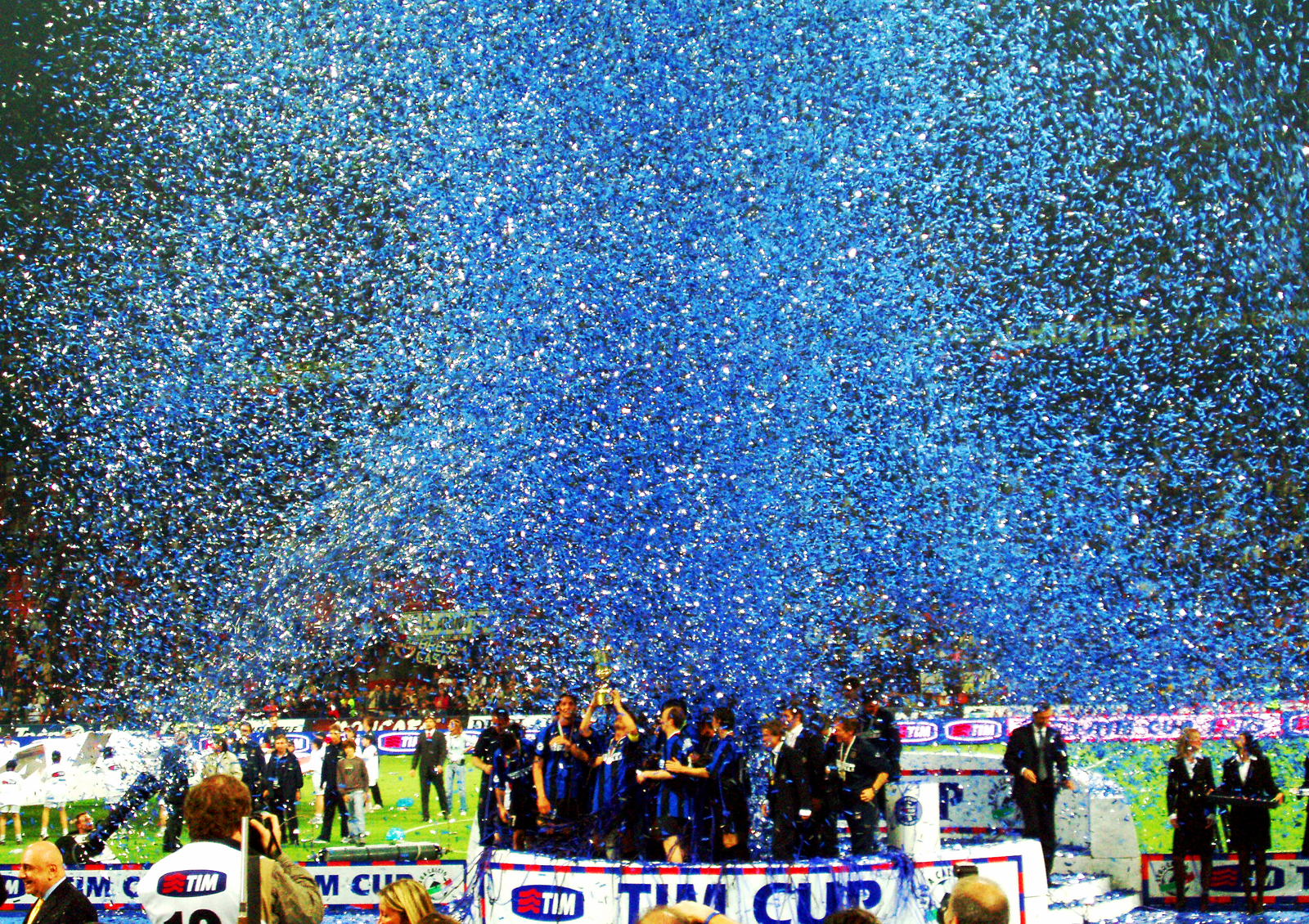
Inter won the 2004–05 Coppa Italia, beating Roma.

On 8 July 2004, Inter appointed former Lazio manager Roberto Mancini as its new head coach, with players who will make the history of Inter like Esteban Cambiasso, Julio Cesar, and in 2005 Walter Samuel and Luis Figo from Real Madrid. In his first season, the team collected 72 points from 18 wins, 18 draws and only two losses, as well as winning the Coppa Italia against Roma, with two goals from Adriano, and later the Supercoppa Italiana in Turin against Juventus with a goal from Juan Sebastián Verón. After Adriano's dominating performances in the 2004 Copa América and the 2005 FIFA Confederations Cup, both won by Brazil, he was awarded the IFFHS World's Best International Goal Scorer in 2005.

On 11 May 2006, Inter won the Coppa Italia title for the second season in a row after defeating Roma with a 4–1 aggregate victory (a 1–1 scoreline in Rome and a 3–1 win at the San Siro).

Inter were awarded the 2005–06 Serie A championship retrospectively, after title-winning Juventus was relegated for match fixing and illecits involved among others referee designators Bergamo and Pairetto and referees, with their executives Moggi and Giraudo, who were at Juventus since 1994, banned for life from football, and points were stripped also from other clubs involved, including AC Milan, due to the implications in Calciopoli scandal. During the following season, Inter with new players like Maicon, Maxwell, Patrick Vieira, Zlatan Ibrahimovic and the return of Crespo from Chelsea, went on a record-breaking run of 17 consecutive victories in Serie A, starting on 25 September 2006, with a 4–1 home victory over Livorno, and ending on 28 February 2007, after a 1–1 draw at home to Udinese. On 22 April 2007, Inter won their second consecutive Scudetto—and first on the field since 1989—when they defeated Siena 2–1 at Stadio Artemio Franchi, ended the season with an all time Serie A record of 97 points and an all-time record margin of 22 points over second place Roma. Italian World Cup-winning defender Marco Materazzi scored both goals.

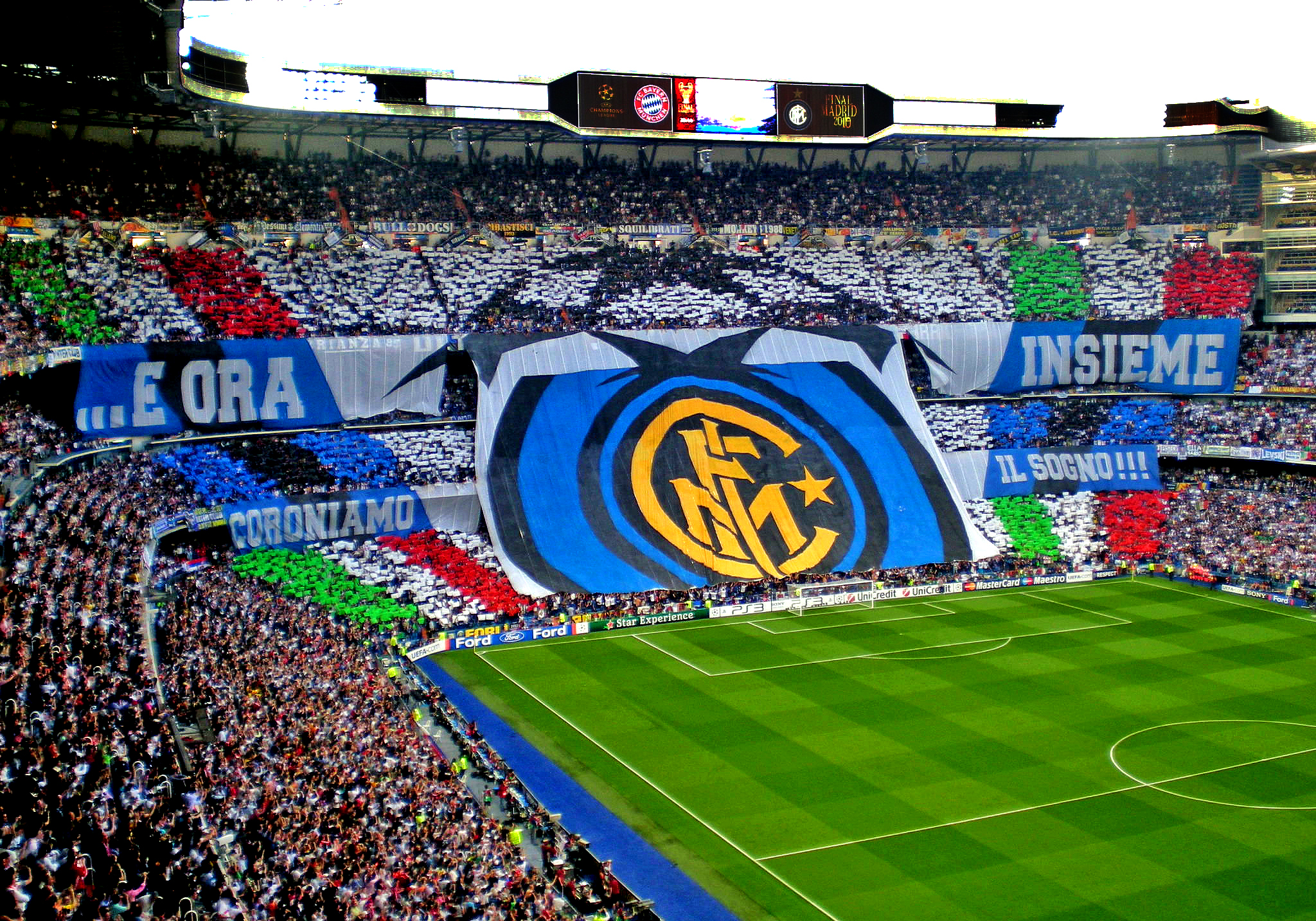
"...and now together we crown the dream!" Inter supporters during the 2010 UEFA Champions League Final at Santiago Bernabéu. In winning the final, Inter became the first and only Italian team to win the treble.

In this period, Inter also reached two UCL quarter-finals in 2005 and 2006, and the UCL round of 16 in 2007: on the last two occasions, Inter was eliminated via away goals rules by Villarreal and Valencia.

Inter started the 2007–08 season with the goal of winning both Serie A and the Champions League in the year of the centenary of the foundation of the club. The team started well in the league, topping the table from the first round of matches, and also managed to qualify for the Champions League knockout stage. However, also due to serious injuries to many important players, a late collapse, leading to a 2–0 defeat with ten men away to Liverpool on 19 February in the Champions League, brought manager Roberto Mancini's future at Inter into question, while domestic form took a sharp turn of fortune, with the team failing to win in the three following Serie A games. After being eliminated by Liverpool in the Champions League, Mancini announced his intention to leave his job immediately, only to change his mind the following day. On the final day of the 2007–08 Serie A season, Inter played Parma away, that had to win to not be relegated in Serie B after 18 years; Roma scored in Catania and was in the first place until Zlatan Ibrahimović, ten minutes after having come on to the pitch in the second half, scored two goals and sealed their third consecutive championship. Mancini, however, was sacked soon after, due to his previous announcement to leave the club.

On 2 June 2008, Inter appointed former Porto and Chelsea boss José Mourinho as the new head coach. In his first season, the Nerazzurri won a Suppercoppa Italiana and a fourth consecutive title, though falling in the Champions League in the first knockout round for a third-straight year, losing to eventual finalists Manchester United. In winning the league title, Inter became the first club since 1949 to win the title for four consecutive seasons, and joined Torino and Juventus as the only clubs to accomplish this feat, as well as being the first club based outside Turin.

2010 UEFA Champions League final starting lineup

In the summer of 2009, Inter laid the foundation for maybe the greatest single season of its history: after have signed Diego Milito and Thiago Motta from Genoa, Lúcio from Bayern Munich, the club agreed to sell Ibrahimovic to Barcelona in change for Samuel Eto'o plus 49 million euros. The transfer window ended with the signing of Wesley Sneijder from Real Madrid on August 26, who three days later played against AC Milan, a game which ended in 4-0 victory. Inter won the 2009–10 Champions League, defeating in round of 16 one of the favourites, Ancelotti's Chelsea, winning both legs, the latter with the first win in Stamford Bridge with a goal from Samuel Eto'o. Then, they beat CSKA Moscow and reigning champions, the Barcelona of Pep Guardiola in the semi-final, with the second leg at the Camp Nou played with ten men for most of the match; they then beat Bayern Munich 2–0 in the final in Madrid, with two goals from Diego Milito. In this season, Chelsea, Barcelona and Bayern all won their domestic championship. Inter also won the 2009–10 Serie A title by two points over Roma, the fifth title in a row, and the 2010 Coppa Italia by defeating the same side 1–0 in the final. This made Inter the first and only Italian team to win the treble. At the end of the season, Mourinho left the club to manage Real Madrid; he was replaced by Rafael Benítez.

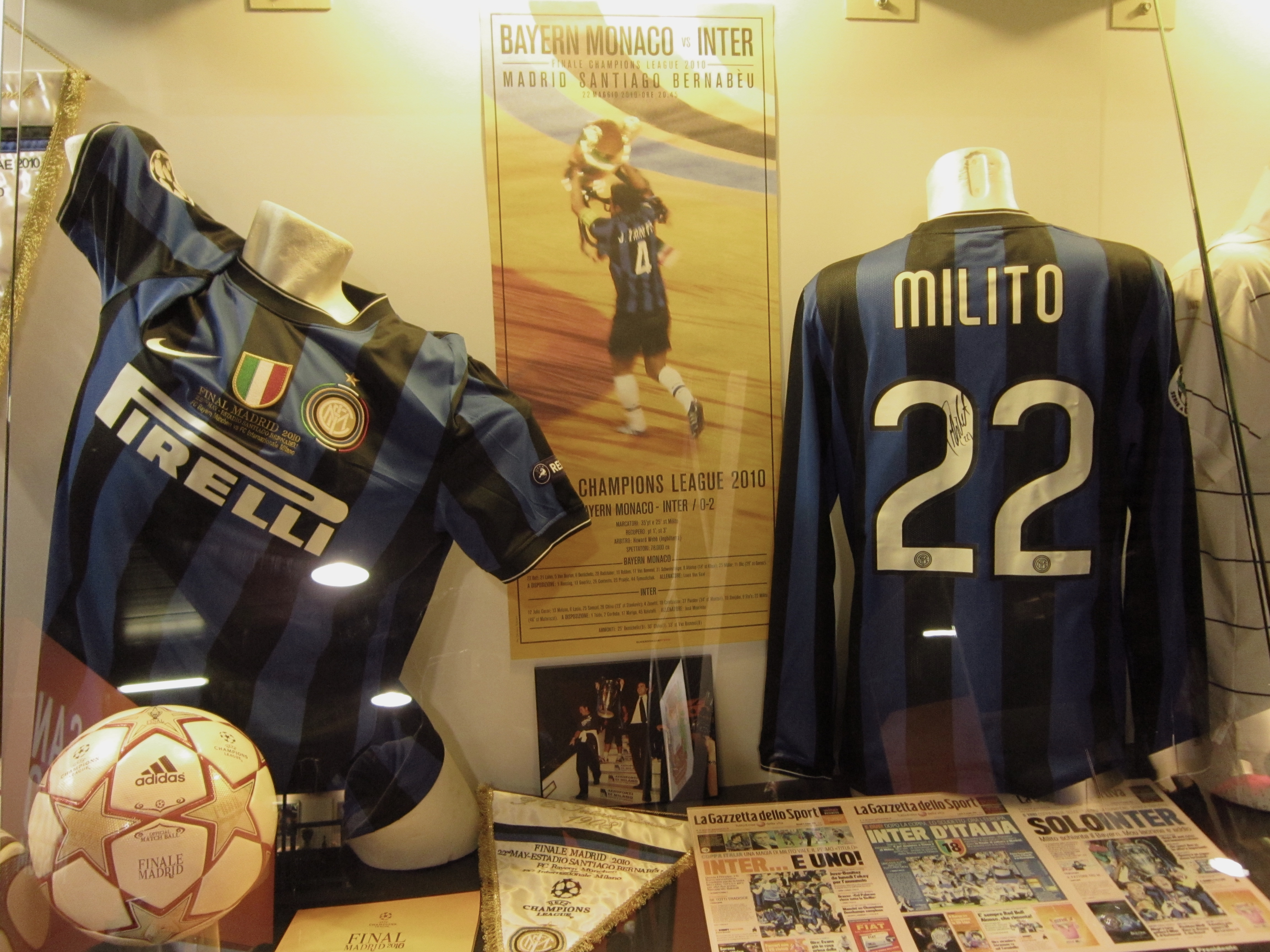
Diego Milito scored 30 goals in 2009-2010 season, most notably in Coppa Italia final, in the last Serie A decisive match against Siena and two goals in Champions League final.

In the summer, Inter sold 20-year-old Balotelli to Manchester City for 29 million euros, the second highest for the club at that time.

On 21 August 2010, Inter defeated Roma 3–1 and won the 2010 Supercoppa Italiana, their fourth trophy of the year. In December 2010, they claimed the FIFA Club World Cup for the first time after a 3–0 win against Mazembe in the final, becoming for the third time world champion. However, after this win, on 23 December 2010, due to their declining performance in Serie A, the club fired Benítez. He was replaced by Leonardo the following day. Inter was also ranked for the second time in 2010 as Best Club in the World by IFFHS.

Leonardo started with 30 points from 12 games, with an average of 2.5 points per game, better than his predecessors Benítez and Mourinho. On 6 March 2011, Leonardo set a new Italian Serie A record by collecting 33 points in 13 games; the previous record was 32 points in 13 games, made by Fabio Capello in the 2004–05 season. Leonardo led the club to the quarter-finals of the Champions League, after having defeated Bayern Munich once again in Round of 16, recovering from a 0–1 home defeat with a 2–3 win in Munich, with decisive goals from Sneijder and Goran Pandev, before subsequently losing to Schalke 04; Inter ended the season second in Serie A and won the Coppa Italia title. At the end of the season, however, he resigned, and was followed by new managers Gian Piero Gasperini, Claudio Ranieri (who qualified Inter for Round of 16 of UCL) and Andrea Stramaccioni, all hired during the following season. Inter finished sixth place in the championship, ending a Serie A record of ten consecutive qualifications for the Champions League, and their first season without a trophy since 2003–2004.

=== Changes in ownership (2011–2019) ===
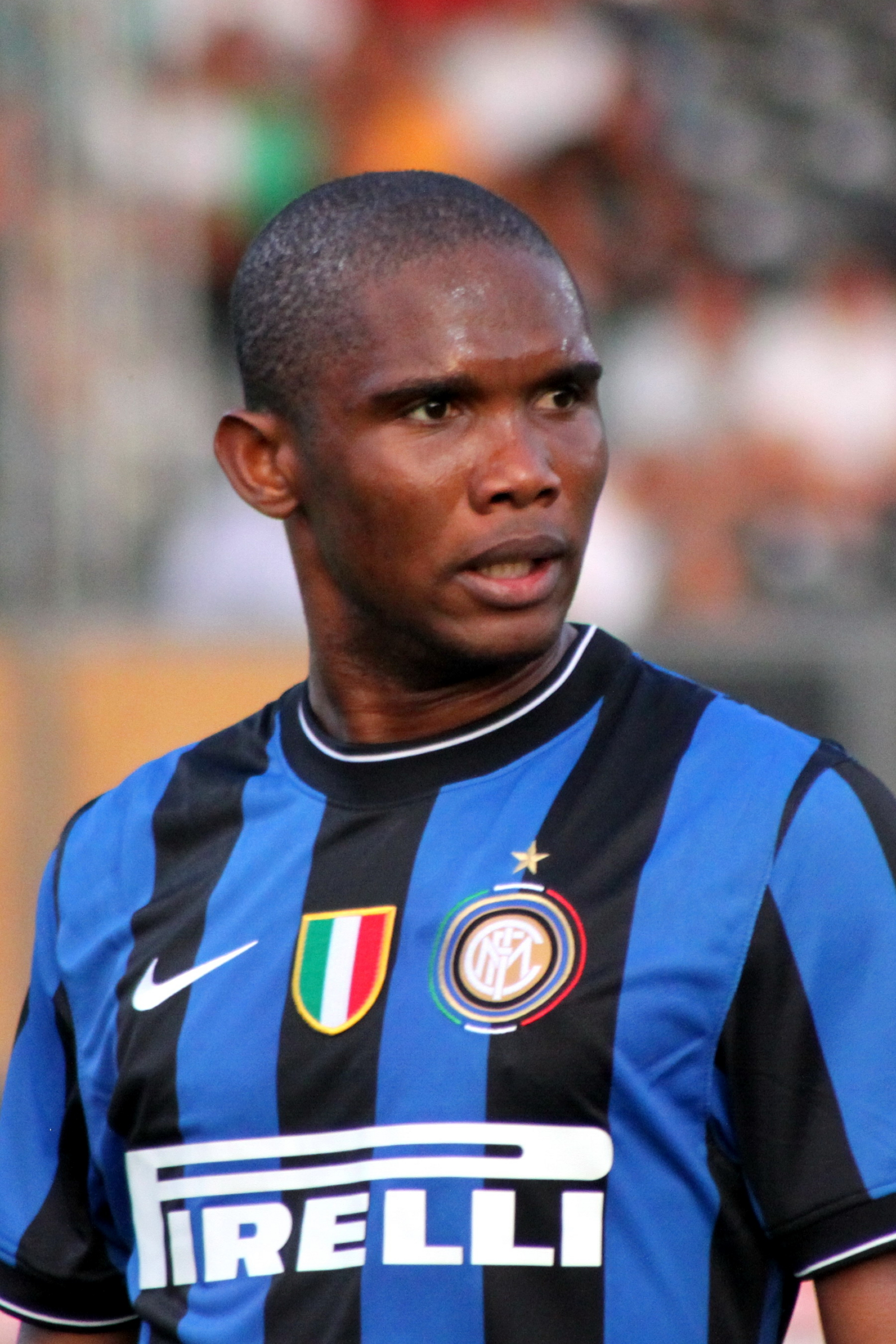
Samuel Eto'o scored a career-high 37 goals in the 2010–11 season, including in the FIFA Club World Cup final, twice in the Supercoppa Italiana final and in the Coppa Italia final.

To fulfill UEFA Financial Fair Play Regulations and to make the club more economically sustainable, Inter spent less on transfer fees and salaries in the early 2010s. From 2011, the payroll was decreased by a third in two years, veterans on higher salaries were replaced with younger players: in August 2011, Eto'o was sold to Anzhi, in January 2012 Thiago Motta left for PSG, in the summer of 2012 Julio Cesar, Maicon and Lucio and also Sneijder in January 2013. This approach weakened the competitiveness of the team for a number of years

On 1 August 2012, the club announced that Moratti was to sell a minority stake of the club to a Chinese consortium led by Kenneth Huang. On the same day, Inter announced an agreement was formed with China Railway Construction Corporation Limited for a new stadium project, however, this deal later collapsed. The 2012–13 season was the worst in recent club history, with Inter finishing ninth in Serie A and failing to qualify for any European competitions, but it was also notable as Inter became the first team to win at the new Juventus Stadium, ending the 49 match unbeaten streak of Juventus in Serie A, with two goals from Milito and one from Rodrigo Palacio. Walter Mazzarri was appointed to replace Stramaccioni as the manager for 2013–14 season on 24 May 2013, having ended his tenure at Napoli. He guided the club to fifth in Serie A and to 2014–15 UEFA Europa League qualification; after the season, the last players of 2010 treble that remained left the team: Chivu, Samuel, Zanetti, Milito and Cambiasso.

On 15 October 2013, an Indonesian consortium (International Sports Capital HK) led by Erick Thohir, Handy Soetedjo and Rosan Roeslani, signed an agreement to acquire 70% of Inter shares from Internazionale Holding S.r.l. Moratti's Internazionale Holding S.r.l. still retained 29.5% of the shares of FC Internazionale Milano S.p.A. After the deal, the shares of Inter were owned by a chain of holding companies, namely International Sports Capital S.p.A. of Italy (for 70% stake), International Sports Capital HK Limited, and Asian Sports Ventures HK Limited of Hong Kong. Asian Sports Ventures HK Limited, itself another intermediate holding company, was owned by Nusantara Sports Ventures HK Limited (60% stake, a company owned by Thohir), Alke Sports Investment HK Limited (20% stake) and Aksis Sports Capital HK Limited (20% stake). Thohir, who also co-owned Major League Soccer (MLS) club D.C. United and Indonesia Super League (ISL) club Persib Bandung, announced on 2 December 2013 that Inter and D.C. United had formed a strategic partnership. Under Thohir's ownership, the club began to modify its financial structure from one reliant on continual owner investment to a self-sustainable business model, although the club still breached UEFA Financial Fair Play Regulations in 2015. The club was fined and received a squad reduction in UEFA competitions, with additional penalties suspended during the probation period. During this time, Roberto Mancini returned as the club manager on 14 November 2014, with Inter finishing eighth. Inter finished 2015–2016 season fourth, failing to return to the Champions League.

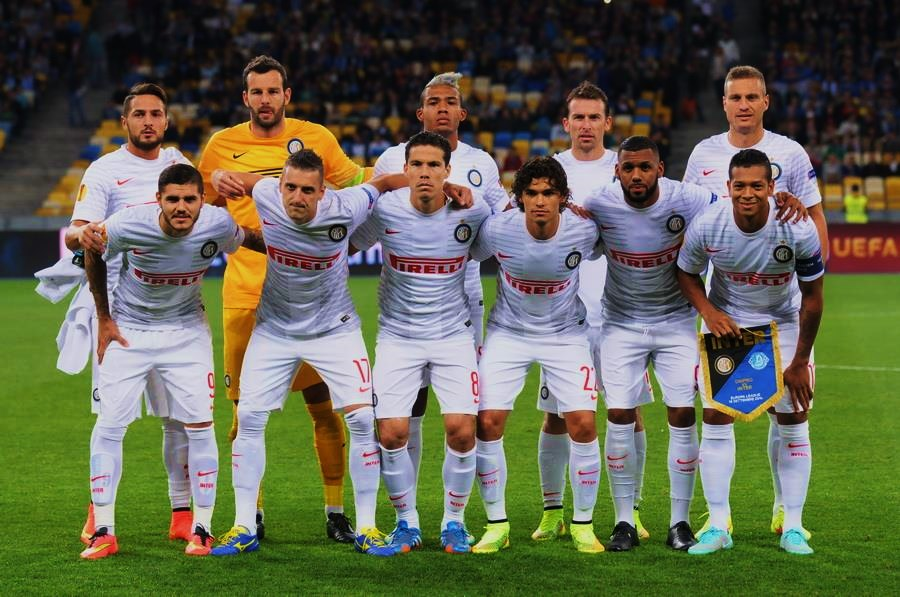
Inter lining up before a Europa League match against Dnipro on 18 September 2014

On 6 June 2016, Suning Holdings Group (via a Luxembourg-based subsidiary Great Horizon S.á r.l.) a company owned by Zhang Jindong, co-founder and chairman of Suning Commerce Group, acquired a majority stake of Inter from Thohir's consortium International Sports Capital S.p.A., and later acquired Moratti's remaining shares in Internazionale Holding S.r.l. According to various filings, the total investment from Suning was €270 million. The deal was approved by an extraordinary general meeting on 28 June 2016, from which Suning Holdings Group had acquired a 68.55% stake in the club.

The first season of new ownership, however, started with poor performance in pre-season friendlies. On 8 August 2016, Inter parted company with head coach Roberto Mancini by mutual consent over disagreements regarding the club's direction, especially regarding new signings Joao Mario, who was acquired for €44.75 million (the second most expensive player in club history at that time) and Gabriel Barbosa for €29.5 million. Mancini was replaced by Frank de Boer, who was sacked on 1 November 2016 after a poor start to the season. His successor, Stefano Pioli, could not prevent the team from getting the worst group result in UEFA competitions in the club's history. Despite an eight-game winning streak, he and the club parted ways before season's end, when it became clear they would finish outside the league's top three for the sixth consecutive season. On 9 June 2017, former Roma coach Luciano Spalletti was appointed as manager, signing a two-year contract. Eleven months later Inter secured a UEFA Champions League group stage spot thanks to a 3–2 victory against Lazio in the final game of 2017–18 Serie A. Among the best tactical moves from Spalletti, there was the change of position for Marcelo Brozovic who became one of the best defensive midfielders in European football. Due to this success, the club extended Spalletti's contract until 2021. On 4 July 2018, Inter signed Lautaro Martínez from Racing Club de Avellaneda for €25 million, who later became the club's third-highest all-time top goalscorer.

On 26 October 2018, Steven Zhang was appointed as the new president of the club, and on 13 December 2018, Giuseppe Marotta joined Inter Milan as CEO. On 25 January 2019, the club announced that LionRock Capital from Hong Kong had reached an agreement with International Sports Capital HK Limited to acquire 31.05% of Inter, becoming the club's new minority shareholder. After the 2018–19 Serie A season, despite finishing fourth in Serie A, Spalletti was sacked.

=== Renewed successes (2019–present) ===
On 31 May 2019, Inter appointed former Juventus and Italian manager Antonio Conte as their new coach, signing a three-year deal. That same year, Inter acquired Romelu Lukaku from Manchester United for €74 million, becoming the most expensive player in club history, Nicolò Barella for €44.5 million from Cagliari and sold Mauro Icardi, one of the best strikers in Italy in the preceding years (two times Serie A top scorer in 2015 and 2018), to Paris Saint-Germain for €50 million. Alessandro Bastoni, who had been acquired from Atalanta in 2017 for €31.1 million, made his debut for Inter in the 2019–20 season. Along with Milan Škriniar and Stefan de Vrij, Bastoni was part of a strong defensive trio in a 3-5-2 that will be the best defence in Serie A in the following years.

In September 2019, Steven Zhang was elected to the board of the European Club Association. In the 2019–20 season, Inter finished as runner-up in Serie A, in a championship suspended on March and concluded in the summer due to COVID-19 related limitations. After an early elimination in Champions League group stage by finishing third, behind Barcelona and Borussia Dortmund, Inter reached the 2020 UEFA Europa League final played on 21 August in Cologne behind closed doors: despite two goals scored by Lukaku and Diego Godin, they eventually lost 3–2 to Sevilla. Inter improved the team with signings of new players, among others, in January 2020 Christian Eriksen from Tottenham Hotspur for €27.5 million and in July 2020 Achraf Hakimi from Real Madrid for €43 million.

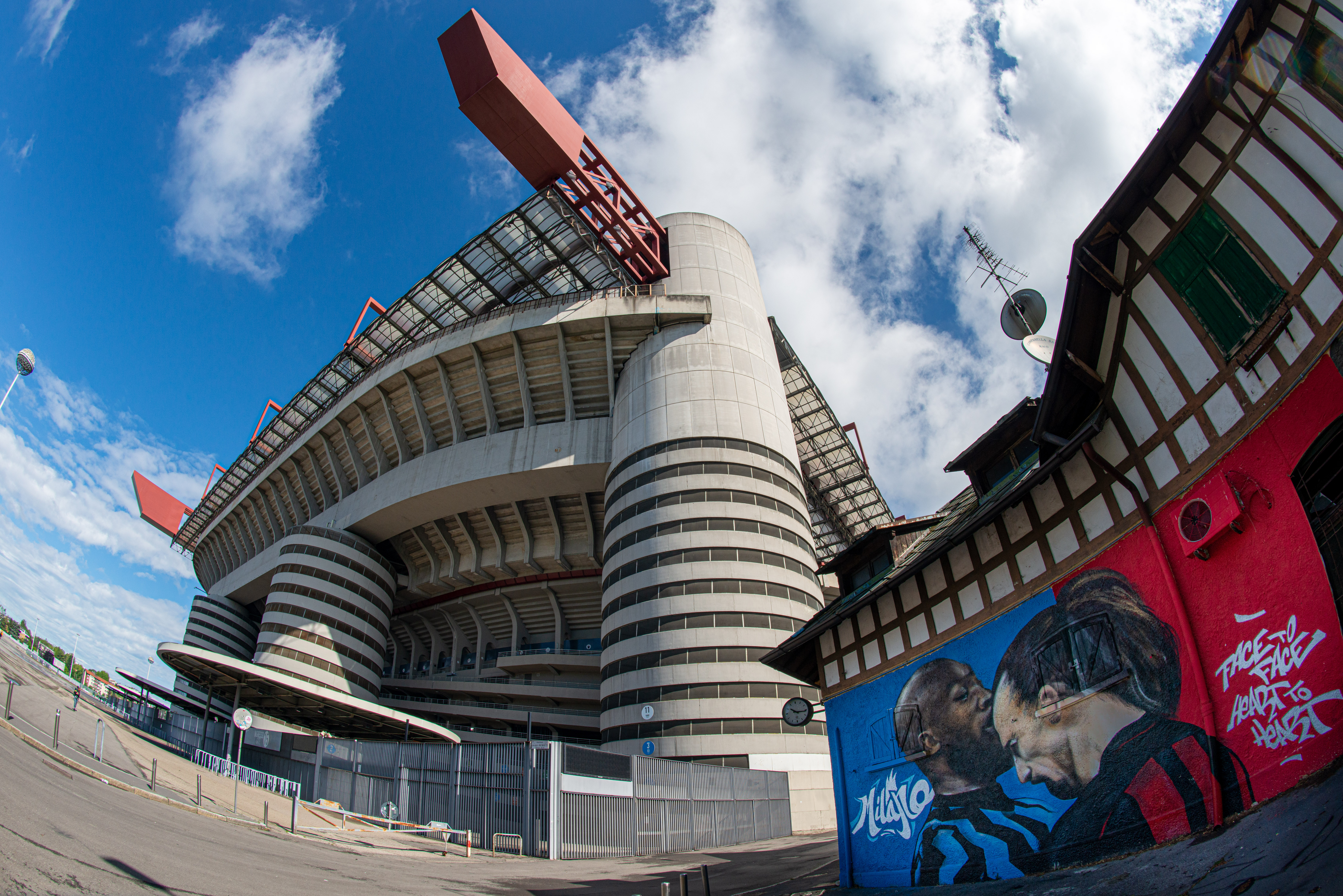
A street art mural outside Giuseppe Meazza stadium depicting a clash between Romelu Lukaku and Zlatan Ibrahimović in January 2021.

Despite enduring the worst result in Champions League group stage in the club's history, Inter subsequently secured a record of 11 consecutive victories from the start of the second half of the season in Serie A. Following a win against Crotone in May 2021, Inter were confirmed as champions for the first time in eleven years, ending Juventus' run of nine consecutive titles and the Zhang family becoming the first foreign ownership group to win Serie A. However, despite this, Conte left the club by mutual consent on 26 May 2021, reportedly due to disagreements between Conte and the board over player transfers. In June 2021, Simone Inzaghi was appointed as Conte's replacement. On 6 July 2021, Hakimi was sold to Paris Saint-Germain for €60 million and was replaced by Denzel Dumfries from PSV Eindhoven. On 8 August, Lukaku was sold to Chelsea for €115 million, representing the most expensive association football transfer by an Italian football club ever. Eriksen was later deemed unable to play in Italy after suffering cardiac arrest during UEFA Euro 2020, and he was replaced by Hakan Çalhanoğlu on a free transfer from AC Milan.

Inter qualified in the UCL Round of 16 for the first time in ten years, but despite the club's first-ever win at Anfield thanks to a goal from Lautaro Martínez, they were eliminated by Liverpool. On 12 January 2022, Inter won the Supercoppa Italiana, defeating Juventus 2–1 at San Siro. In the last second of the extra time, Alexis Sánchez scored the winning goal, giving Inzaghi the first trophy as Inter manager. On 11 May 2022, Inter won the Coppa Italia, defeating Juventus 4–2 at Stadio Olimpico. After normal time ended 2–2, with Barella and Hakan Çalhanoğlu scoring Inter's goals, Ivan Perišić's brace in the extra time gave Inter the win and a second trophy of the season. The 2021–22 Serie A campaign saw Inter finish in second place, being the most prolific attacking side with 84 goals scored. After the autumn break for the 2022 FIFA World Cup, on 18 January 2023, Inter won the Supercoppa Italiana, defeating Milan 3−0 at King Fahd International Stadium, thanks to goals from Federico Dimarco, Edin Džeko, and Martínez.

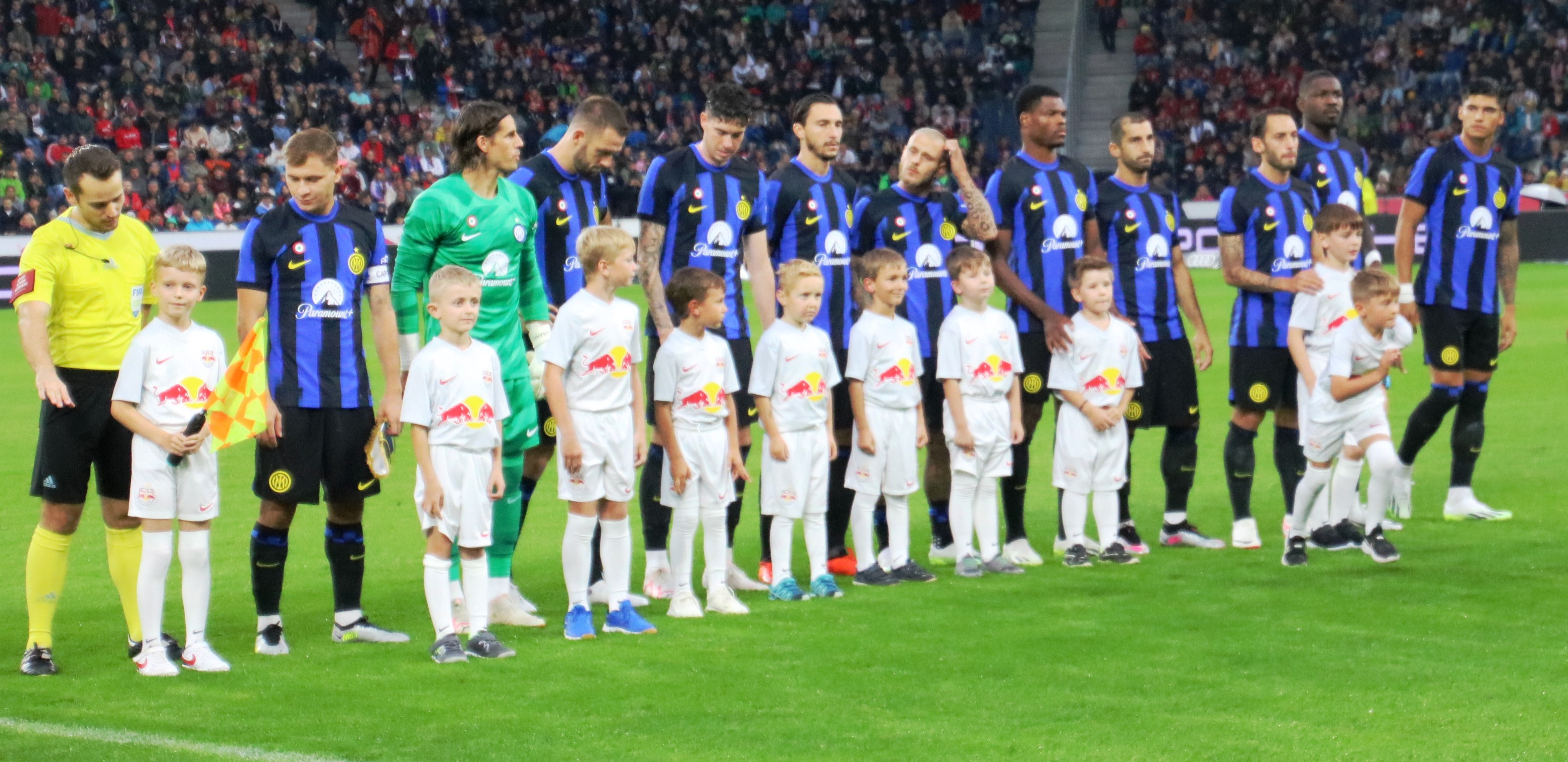
Inter players line up before a pre-season friendly against Salzburg in August 2023.

Inter advanced beyond the UCL group stage after eliminating Barcelona, and then after having defeated Porto and Benfica, qualified for the semi-finals. On 16 May 2023, Inter defeated archrivals Milan in the semi-finals of 2022–23 UEFA Champions League with goals from Džeko and Henrikh Mkhitaryan in the first leg, and a goal from Martinez in the second leg, advancing to the Champions League final for the first time since 2010. However, they were defeated at the Atatürk Olympic Stadium 1−0 by Manchester City after a second half goal from midfielder Rodri. In July 2023, Inter sold André Onana to Manchester United for €50 million and acquired Marcus Thuram on a free transfer. Samir Handanović retired after 11 seasons and 455 appearances for the club, registering an all-time record in Serie A of 26 penalties saved. Brozović was sold to Al Nassr, Škriniar moved to Paris Saint-Germain on a free transfer, while other players were added to the squad: Davide Frattesi from Sassuolo (€33 million), Benjamin Pavard (€30 million) and Yann Sommer (€6.9 million) both from Bayern Munich. Inter started the subsequent season with five consecutive wins, including a 5 to 1 victory over Milan, the largest in the Milan derby since 2009. In January 2024, Inter won its third consecutive and eighth overall Supercoppa Italiana, tying the record set by Milan in the 1990s for consecutive wins by defeating Lazio 3–0 in the semi-finals and Napoli 1–0 in the final, with a late goal by Martínez. On 22 April 2024, Inter secured their 20th Serie A title and the second Star by defeating Milan 2–1 at the San Siro, recording a record sixth consecutive Derby della Madonnina win. The team finished a dominant season with 94 points, 19 over second-place Milan, scoring a league-high 89 goals, and the strongest defence, with 22 goals conceded: this +67 differential was the best in Serie A since the 1950–1951 season.

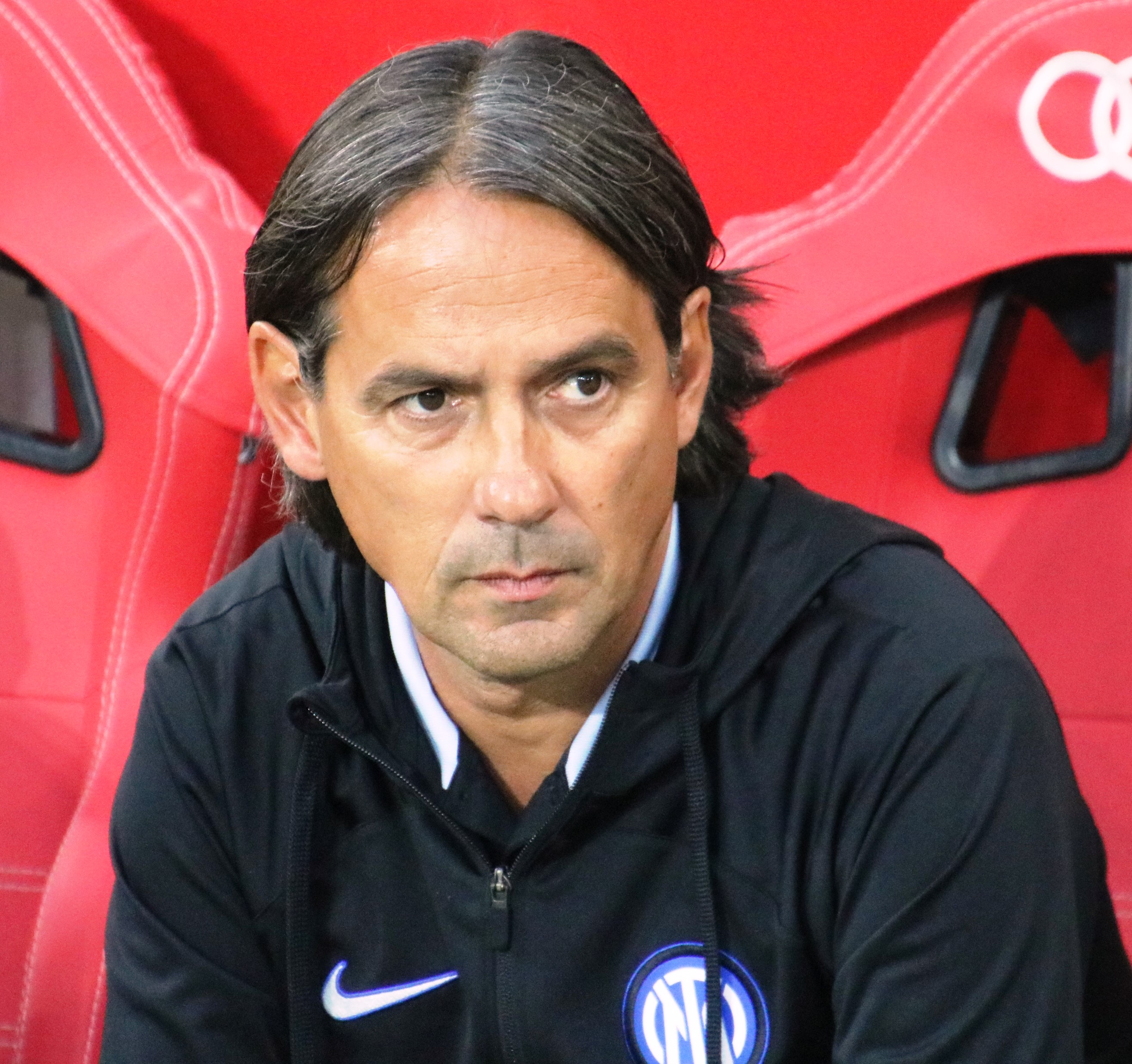
Simone Inzaghi coached Inter from 2021 to 2025, he holds the club record for most wins in the Champions League and in all UEFA competitions (25).

On 22 May 2024, Oaktree Capital Management assumed ownership of Inter following the default of Suning Holdings Group on a €395 million ($428 million) loan against the club given in May 2021 to cover losses incurred during the COVID-19 pandemic. The new ownership chose to appoint CEO Giuseppe Marotta as the club's new chairman. Inter began their first season under the new ownership by drawing 2–2 to Genoa. The 2024–25 season ultimately proved to be a disappointment for the Nerazzurri as despite looking likely for a treble with a month of the season to go: nationally Inter finished second behind Napoli by a point in Serie A, exit the Coppa Italia in the semi finals by losing to Milan (who also previously in January came from behind to beat them in the Supercoppa Italiana final). In the Champions League Inter finished fourth in the new league phase ensuring automatic advancement to the round of 16, with only one goal conceded in eight matches. Inter then beat Feyenoord in the round of 16, Bayern Munich 4–3 on aggregate in the quarter finals (winning in Munich ending a run of 22 matches in 4 years of unbeaten home run for the German team) and Barcelona in a thrilling 7–6 semi final tie: after a 3–3 in Spain in the first leg, a win for 4–3 in San Siro in extra time after being up 2–0, then down 2–3 until the equalizer in the last minutes in regulation time with a goal from Acerbi and then the decisive goal from Frattesi which meant Inter would make the Champions League final for the seventh time in their history and second time in three seasons. Despite having lost only once in 14 matches in the UCL this season, Inter lost the final 5–0 to Paris Saint-Germain. This marked a first trophyless season for the club since the 2019–20 season.

Three days after the final, Inzaghi left the club by mutual consent, two weeks before Inter's first game in the inaugural FIFA Club World Cup held in the United States. Former treble-winning Inter player Cristian Chivu was then appointed as the club's new head coach. In the FIFA Club World Cup, after a draw against Monterrey in the first match played at the Rose Bowl in Pasadena, they won the next two matches at Lumen Field in Seattle: the first against the Urawa Red Diamonds 2-1 and the second against River Plate 2-0, going through the group in first place, only to be eliminated in the round of 16 of the competition by Fluminense. Although Chivu’s first season at Inter began with considerable skepticism, as he had limited coaching experience with only 13 matches at Parma before joining Inter, he led Inter Milan to a domestic double, winning both the Scudetto and the Coppa Italia in the 2025–2026 season.

== Colours and badge ==
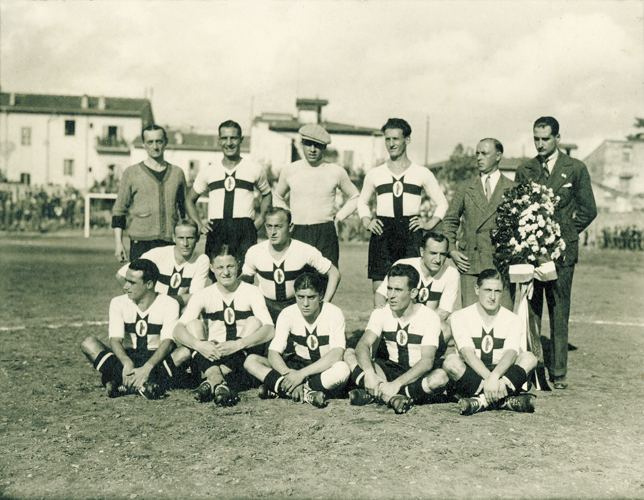
1928–29 S.S. Ambrosiana in its white and red Crociata shirt

One of the founders of Inter, a painter named Giorgio Muggiani, was responsible for the design of the first Inter logo in 1908. The first design incorporated the letters "FCIM" in the centre of a series of circles that formed the badge of the club. The basic elements of the design have remained constant even as finer details have been modified over the years. Starting from the 1999–2000 season, the original club crest was reduced in size, to create space for the addition of the club's name and foundation year at the upper and lower part of the logo respectively.

In 2007, the logo was returned to the pre-1999–2000 era. It was given a more modern look with a smaller Scudetto star and lighter colour scheme. This version was used until July 2014, when the club decided to undertake a rebranding. The most significant difference between the current and the previous logo is the omission of the star from other media except match kits.

Since its founding in 1908, Inter have almost always worn black and blue stripes, earning them the nickname Nerazzurri. According to the tradition, the colours were adopted to represent the nocturnal sky: in fact, the club was established on the night of 9 March, at 23:30; moreover, blue was chosen by Giorgio Muggiani because he considered it to be the opposite colour to red, worn by the Milan Cricket and Football Club rivals.

During the 1928–29 season, however, Inter were forced by Fascist regime to abandon their black and blue uniforms. In 1928, Inter's name and philosophy made the ruling Fascist Party uneasy; as a result, during the same year the 20-year-old club was merged with Unione Sportiva Milanese: the new club was named Società Sportiva Ambrosiana after the patron saint of Milan. The flag of Milan (the red cross on white background) replaced the traditional black and blue. In 1929, the black-and-blue jerseys were restored, and after World War II, when the Fascists had fallen from power, the club reverted to their original name. In 2008, Inter celebrated their centenary with a red cross on their away shirt. The cross is reminiscent of the flag of their city, and they continue to use the pattern on their third kit. In 2014, the club adopted a predominantly black home kit with thin blue pinstripes before returning to a more traditional design the following season.

Animals are often used to represent football clubs in Italy – the grass snake, called Biscione, represents Inter. The snake is a symbol for the city of Milan, appearing often in Milanese heraldry as a coiled viper with a man in its jaws. The symbol is present on the coat of arms of the House of Sforza (which ruled over Italy from Milan during the Renaissance period), the city of Milan, the historical Duchy of Milan (a 400-year state of the Holy Roman Empire) and Insubria (a historical region the city of Milan falls within). For the 2010–11 season, Inter's away kit featured the snake.

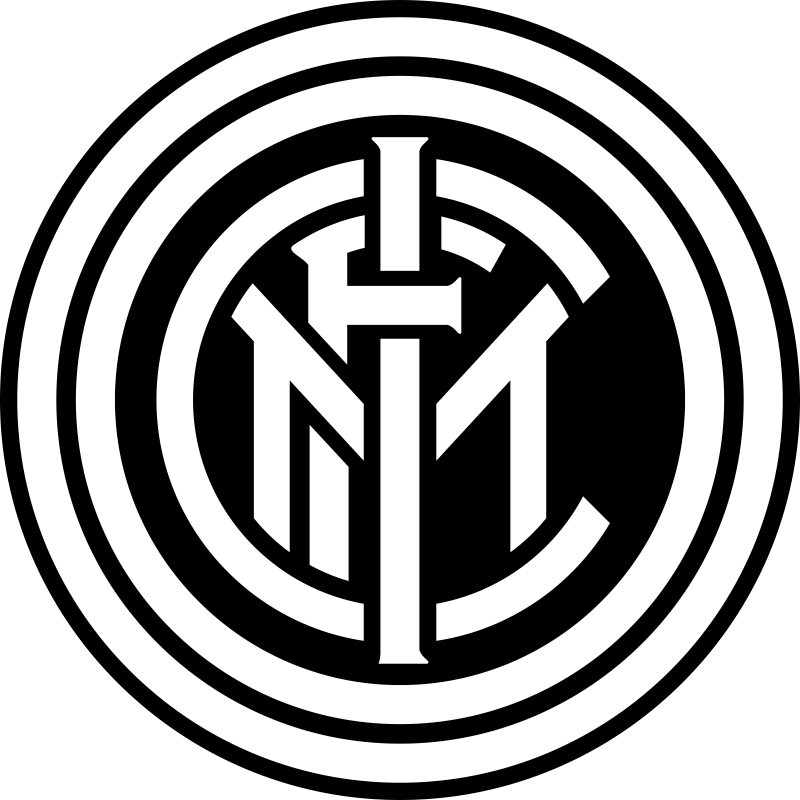
1908–1928

1963–1979

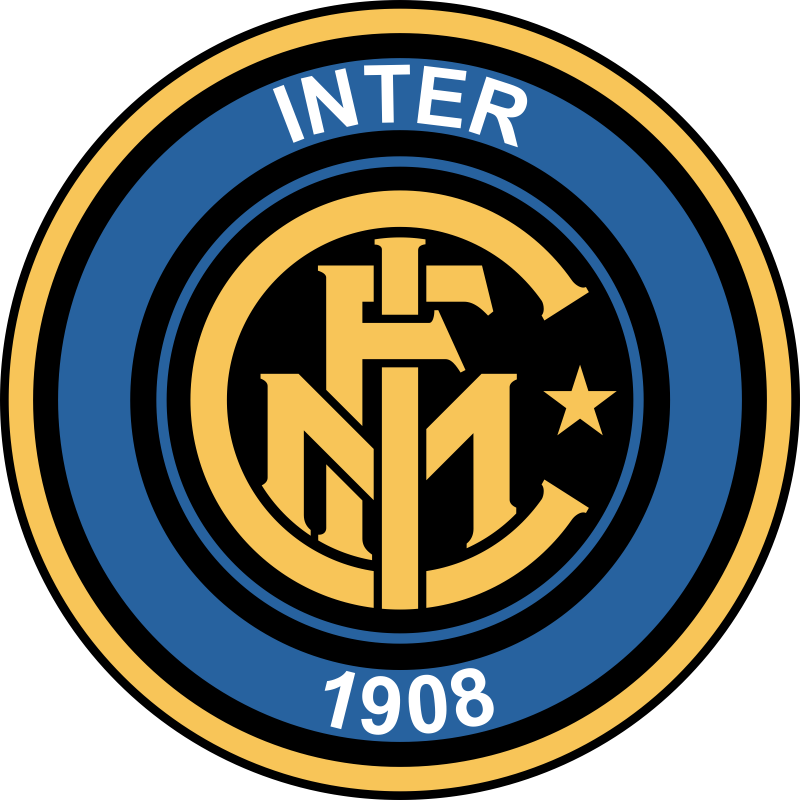
1998–2007

2007–2014

2014–2021

2021–present

== Stadium ==
An aerial view of San Siro

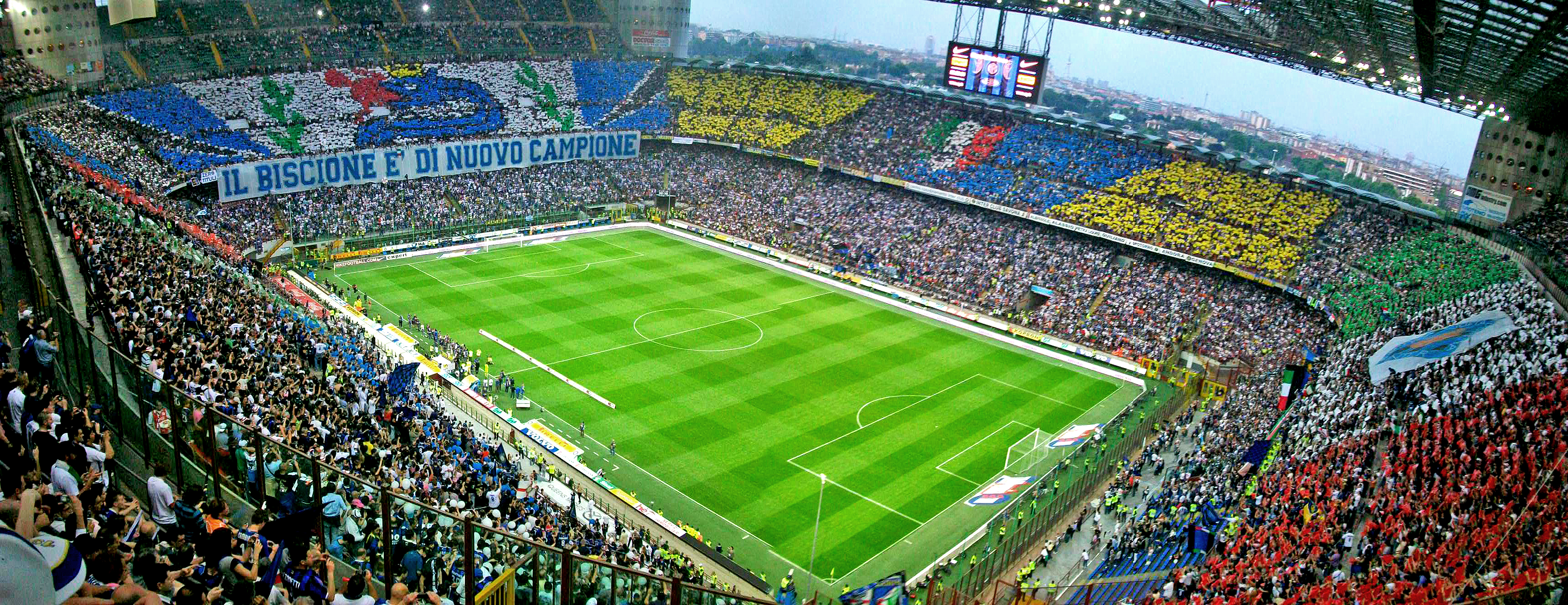
San Siro during an Inter match

The team's stadium is the 75,923 seat San Siro, officially known as the Stadio Giuseppe Meazza after the former player who represented for 14 seasons Inter and for two Milan. The more commonly used name, San Siro, is the name of the district where it is located. San Siro has been the home of Milan since 1926, when it was privately built by funding from Milan's chairman at the time, Piero Pirelli. Construction was performed by 120 workers, and took 13 1/2 months to complete. The stadium was owned by the club until it was sold to the city in 1935, and since 1947 it has been shared with Inter, when they were accepted as joint tenant, moving from the Arena Civica.

The first game played at the stadium was on 19 September 1926, when Inter beat Milan 6–3 in a friendly match. Milan played its first league game in San Siro on 19 September 1926, losing 1–2 to Sampierdarenese. From an initial capacity of 35,000 spectators, the stadium has undergone several major renovations. A major structural renovation was made for the 2016 UEFA Champions League Final while another one took place in late 2021 to host the UEFA Nations League final. The stadium is going to be refurbished again in time for Milano Cortina 2026.

Based on the English model for stadiums, San Siro is specifically designed for football matches, as opposed to many multi-purpose stadiums used in Serie A. It is therefore renowned in Italy for its atmosphere during matches, owing to the closeness of the stands to the pitch.

=== New Milano Stadium ===
Since 2012, various proposals and projects by Massimo Moratti have alternated regarding a possible construction of a new Inter stadium. Between June and July 2019, Inter and Milan announced the agreement for the construction of a new shared stadium in the San Siro area. In the winter of 2021, Giuseppe Sala, the mayor of Milan, gave official permission for the construction of the new stadium next to San Siro, which is expected to be partially demolished and refunctionalised after the 2026 Winter Olympic Games. In early 2022, Inter and Milan revealed a "plan B" to relocate the construction of the new Milano stadium in the Greater Milan, away from the San Siro area.

== Supporters and rivalries ==
According to an August 2024 research by Ipsos., Inter is the second-most supported football club in Italy, only being second to Juventus. In the early years (until the First World War), Inter fans from the city of Milan were typically middle class, while Milan fans were typically working class. During Massimo Moratti's ownership, Inter fans were considered to be on the moderate left. At the same time, during Silvio Berlusconi's reign, Milan fans were viewed as belonging to the centre-right.

The traditional ultras group of Inter is Boys San; which are one of the oldest Italian ultras groups, being founded in 1969. Politically, one group (Irriducibili) of Inter Ultras are right-wing and this group has relations with the Lazio ultras. As well as the main group (apolitical) of Boys San, there are five more significant groups: Viking (apolitical), Irriducibili (right-wing), Ultras (apolitical), Brianza Alcoolica (apolitical) and Imbastisci (left-wing).

Inter's most vocal fans gather in the Curva Nord, or north curve of the San Siro. This longstanding tradition has led to the Curva Nord being synonymous with the club's most die-hard supporters, who unfurl banners and wave flags in support of their team. Throughout 2024, the Curva Nord (labelled as the "Curva Nord Milano") collaborated with rap duo ¥$ (composed of Kanye West and Ty Dolla Sign) on multiple occasions, appearing as a choir on the chart-topping hit song "Carnival" (alongside rapping on its chorus) featuring Playboi Carti and Rich the Kid, and on the ¥$ remix of "Like That", featuring Future and record producer Metro Boomin.

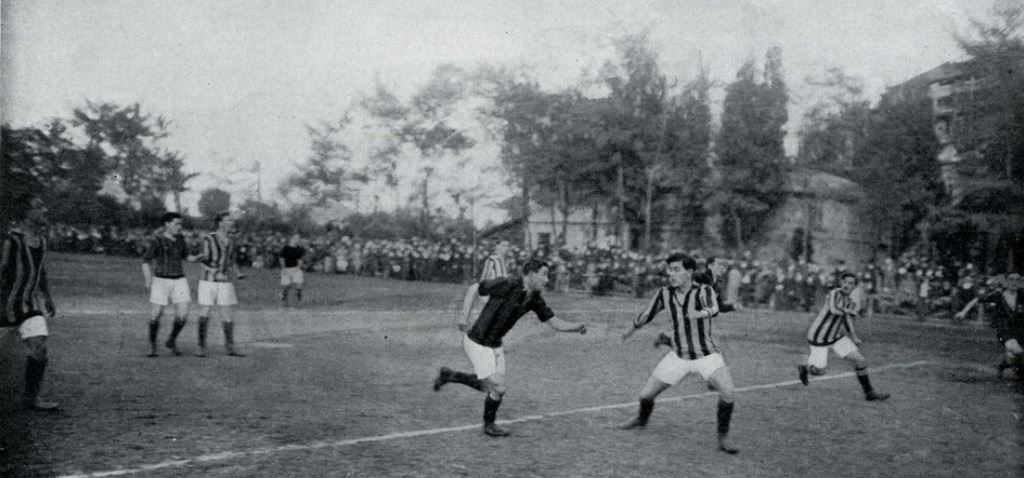
Scene of a Derby della Madonnina in 1915

Inter have several rivalries, two of which are highly significant in Italian football; firstly, they participate in the intracity Derby della Madonnina with Milan; the rivalry has existed ever since Inter splintered off from Milan in 1908. The name of the derby refers to the Blessed Virgin Mary atop the Milan Cathedral. The match usually creates a lively atmosphere, with numerous (often humorous or offensive) banners unfolded before the match. Flares are commonly present, but they also led to the abandonment of the second leg of the 2004–05 Champions League quarter-final matchup between Milan and Inter on 12 April, after a flare thrown from the crowd by an Inter supporter struck Milan keeper Dida on the shoulder.

The other principal rivalry is with Juventus; matches between the two clubs are known as the Derby d'Italia. Up until the 2006 Italian football scandal, which saw Juventus relegated, the two were the only Italian clubs never to have played below Serie A. In the 2000s, Inter developed a rivalry with Roma, who finished as runners-up to Inter in all but one of Inter's five Scudetto-winning seasons between 2005–06 and 2009–10. The two sides have also contested in five Coppa Italia finals and four Supercoppa Italiana finals since 2006. Other clubs, like Atalanta and Napoli, are also considered among their rivals. Their supporters collectively go by Interisti, or Nerazzurri.

== Honours ==
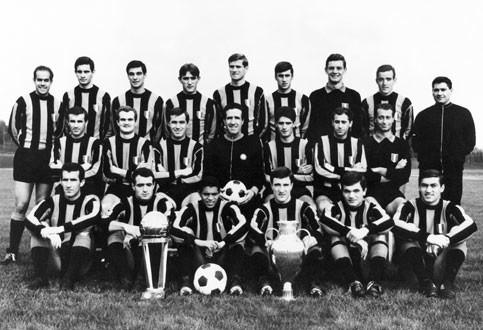
The Inter team which won the Intercontinental Cup in 1965

Inter have won 39 domestic trophies, including the Serie A twenty one times, the Coppa Italia ten times, and the Supercoppa Italiana eight times. From 2006 to 2010, the club won five successive league titles, equalling the all-time record before 2017, when Juventus won their sixth successive league title. They have won the UEFA Champions League three times: two back-to-back in 1964 and 1965, and then another in 2010; the last completed an unprecedented Italian treble with the Coppa Italia and the Scudetto. The club has also won three UEFA Europa League, two Intercontinental Cup, and one FIFA Club World Cup.

Inter has never been relegated from the top flight of Italian football in its entire existence and the sole club to have competed in Serie A and its predecessors in every season since its debut in 1909. Inter is also the only Italian club to have won at least one official trophy in every decade since the foundation of the club in 1908.

Inter honours
Type	Competition	Titles	Seasons
Domestic	Serie A	21	1909–10, 1919–20, 1929–30, 1937–38, 1939–40, 1952–53, 1953–54, 1962–63, 1964–65, 1965–66, 1970–71, 1979–80, 1988–89, 2005–06, 2006–07, 2007–08, 2008–09, 2009–10, 2020–21, 2023–24, 2025–26
Domestic	Coppa Italia	10	1938–39, 1977–78, 1981–82, 2004–05, 2005–06, 2009–10, 2010–11, 2021–22, 2022–23, 2025–26
Domestic	Supercoppa Italiana	8	1989, 2005, 2006, 2008, 2010, 2021, 2022, 2023
Continental	European Cup / UEFA Champions League	3	1963–64, 1964–65, 2009–10
Continental	UEFA Cup	3	1990–91, 1993–94, 1997–98
Worldwide	Intercontinental Cup	2	1964, 1965
Worldwide	FIFA Club World Cup	1	2010

== Club statistics and records ==
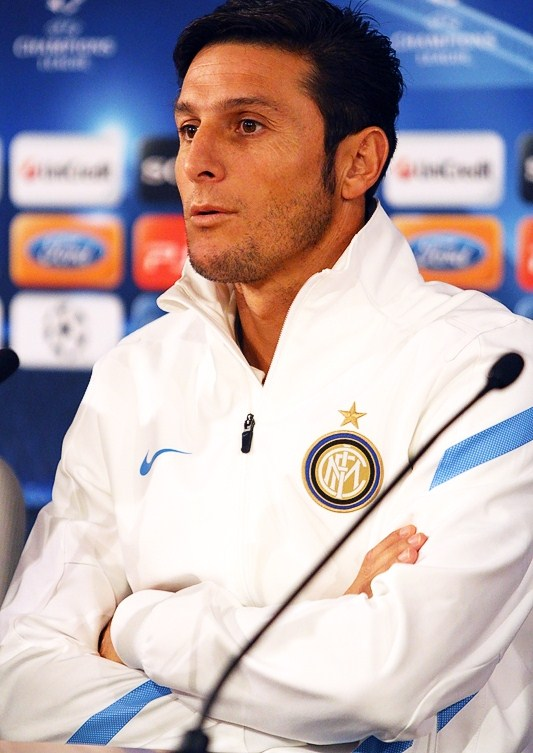
Javier Zanetti made a record 858 appearances for Internazionale, including 618 in Serie A.

Javier Zanetti holds the appearances record for Inter, with 858 games played. Giuseppe Meazza is Inter's all-time top goalscorer, with 284 goals in 408 games. Helenio Herrera had the longest and most successful reign as Inter coach, with nine years (eight consecutive) in charge: he won three Scudetti, two European Cups, and two Intercontinental Cups. José Mourinho, who was appointed in 2008, won the first "treble" in Italian history: the Serie A, Coppa Italia and the UEFA Champions League in 2010.

== Players ==
=== Current squad ===
As of 31 August 2026

Note: Flags indicate national team as defined under FIFA eligibility rules; some limited exceptions apply. Players may hold more than one non-FIFA nationality.

No.	Pos.	Nation	Player
1	GK	ESP	Josep Martínez
5	MF	SRB	Aleksandar Stanković
6	DF	ENG	John Stones
7	MF	POL	Piotr Zieliński
8	MF	CRO	Petar Sučić
9	FW	FRA	Marcus Thuram
10	FW	ARG	Lautaro Martínez (captain)
11	MF	BRA	Luis Henrique
12	GK	ITA	Raffaele Di Gennaro
14	FW	CIV	Ange-Yoan Bonny
17	MF	FRA	Andy Diouf
20	MF	TUR	Hakan Çalhanoğlu

No.	Pos.	Nation	Player
21	MF	ENG	Curtis Jones
22	MF	ARM	Henrikh Mkhitaryan
23	MF	ITA	Nicolò Barella (vice-captain)
25	DF	SUI	Manuel Akanji
28	DF	FRA	Benjamin Pavard
30	DF	BRA	Carlos Augusto
31	DF	GER	Yann Bisseck
32	DF	ITA	Federico Dimarco
49	GK	ITA	Ivan Provedel
94	FW	ITA	Pio Esposito
95	DF	ITA	Alessandro Bastoni
99	DF	ENG	Djed Spence

=== Inter Milan U23 and Youth Sector ===
As of 31 October 2026

Note: Flags indicate national team as defined under FIFA eligibility rules; some limited exceptions apply. Players may hold more than one non-FIFA nationality.

No.	Pos.	Nation	Player
40	GK	ALB	Alain Taho
45	DF	ITA	Francesco Stante
46	DF	ITA	Leonardo Bovio
48	FW	ITA	Mattia Mosconi

No.	Pos.	Nation	Player
51	DF	CRO	Leon Jakirović
52	FW	ITA	Jamal Iddrissou
53	FW	ITA	Matteo Lavelli
54	DF	ITA	Mattia Marello

=== Out on loan ===
As of 24 September 2026

Note: Flags indicate national team as defined under FIFA eligibility rules; some limited exceptions apply. Players may hold more than one non-FIFA nationality.

No.	Pos.	Nation	Player
—	DF	FRA	Yvan Maye (at Monza until 30 June 2027)
—	DF	ARG	Tomás Palacios (at Estudiantes (LP) until 31 December 2026)
—	MF	NGR	Ebenezer Akinsanmiro (at Monza until 30 June 2027)
—	MF	ALB	Kristjan Asllani (at Al Jazira until 30 June 2027)

No.	Pos.	Nation	Player
—	MF	ARG	Valentín Carboni (at Racing Club until 31 December 2027)
—	MF	ITA	Davide Frattesi (at Lazio until 30 June 2027)
—	MF	FRA	Yanis Massolin (at Cagliari until 30 June 2027)

=== Retired numbers ===
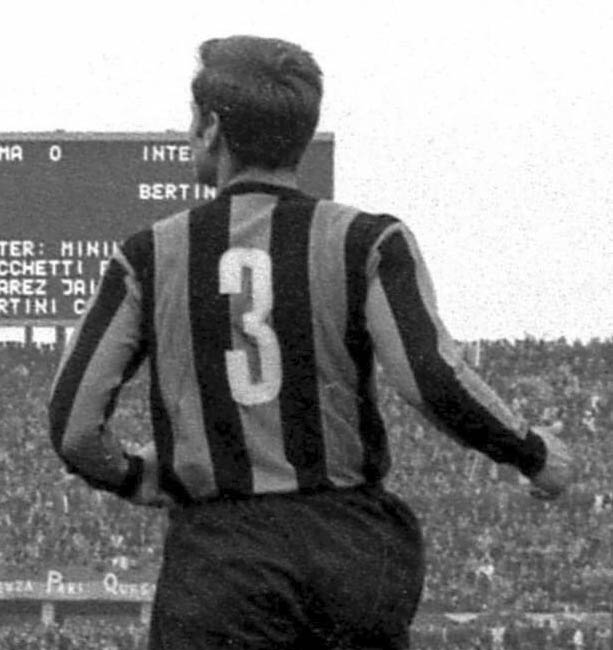
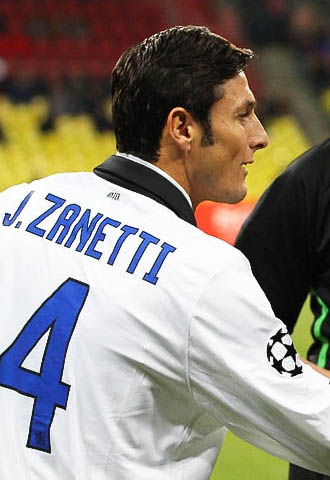
Giacinto Facchetti's #3 and Javier Zanetti's #4 are the two numbers retired by Inter

3 – (Italy) Giacinto Facchetti, left back, played for his entire career at Inter from 1960 to 1978 (posthumous honour). The number was retired on 8 September 2006, four days after Facchetti had died from cancer aged 64. The last player to wear the number 3 shirt was Argentinian centre back Nicolás Burdisso, who took on the number 16 shirt for the rest of the season.

4 – (Argentina) Javier Zanetti, wing-back/full-back, played 858 games for Inter between 1995 and his retirement in the summer of 2014. In June 2014, club chairman Erick Thohir confirmed that Zanetti's number 4 was to be retired out of respect.

== Technical staff ==
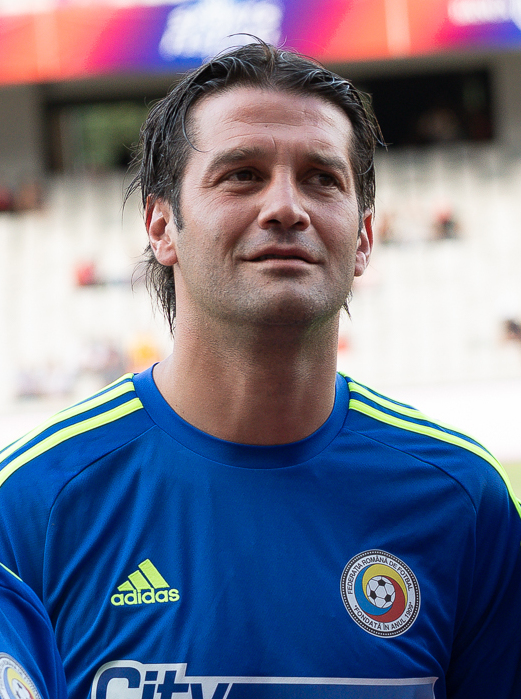
Cristian Chivu is the current head coach of the club.

As of 14 June 2025

Position	Name
Head coach	(Romania) Cristian Chivu
Assistant coach	(Serbia) Aleksandar Kolarov
Technical assistant	(Italy) Mario Cecchi (Italy) Angelo Palombo (Italy) Riccardo Rocchini
Fitness coach	(Italy) Stefano Rapetti (Italy) Maurizio Franchini
Goalkeeper coach	(Italy) Gianluca Spinelli (Italy) Paolo Orlandoni
Functional rehab	(Italy) Andrea Belli
Head of match analysis	(Italy) Filippo Lorenzon
Match analyst	(Italy) Stefano Castellani (Italy) Giacomo Toninato (Italy) Salvatore Rustico
Fitness data analyst	(Italy) Marcello Muratore
Head of medical staff	(Italy) Piero Volpi
Squad doctor	(Italy) Claudio Sprenger (Italy) Alessandro Quaglia (Italy) Lorenzo Brambilla
Physiotherapists coordinator	(Italy) Marco Dellacasa
Physiotherapist	(Italy) Leonardo Arici (Italy) Ramon Cavallin (Italy) Miro Carli (Italy) Davide Lama
Physiotherapist/Osteopath	(Italy) Andrea Veschi
Nutritionist	(Italy) Matteo Pincella

== Chairmen and managers ==
=== Chairmen history ===
Below is a list of Inter chairmen from 1908 until the present day.

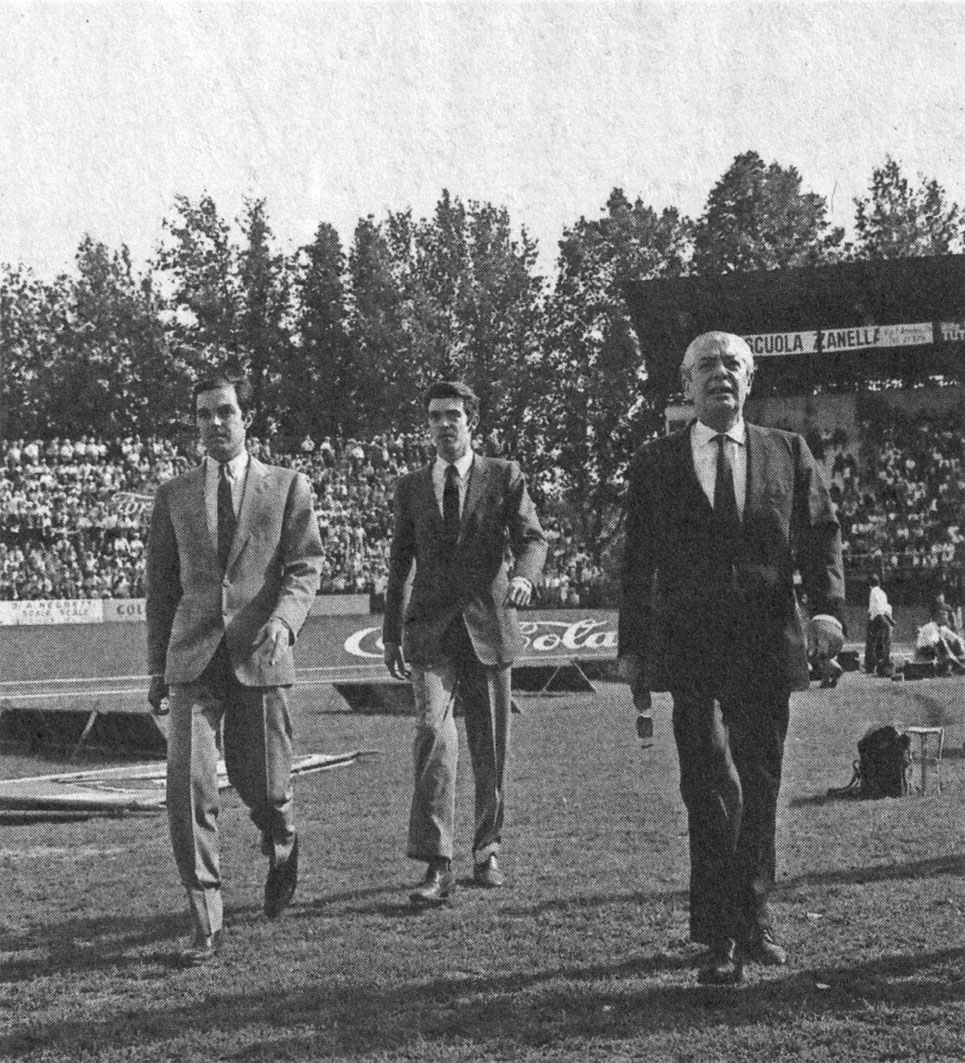
Angelo Moratti (right) and Massimo Moratti (centre), the two most successful presidents in the history of the club

Name	Years
(Italy) Giovanni Paramithiotti	1908–1909
(Italy) Ettore Strauss	1909–1910
(Italy) Carlo De Medici	1910–1912
(Italy) Emilio Hirzel	1912–1913
(Italy) Luigi Ansbacher	1913–1914
(Italy) Giuseppe Visconti di Modrone	1914–1919
(Italy) Giorgio Hulss	1919–1920
(Italy) Francesco Mauro	1920–1923
(Italy) Enrico Olivetti	1923–1926
(Italy) Senatore Borletti	1926–1929
(Italy) Ernesto Torrusio	1929–1930
(Italy) Oreste Simonotti	1930–1932

Name	Years
(Italy) Ferdinando Pozzani	1932–1942
(Italy) Carlo Masseroni	1942–1955
(Italy) Angelo Moratti	1955–1968
(Italy) Ivanoe Fraizzoli	1968–1984
(Italy) Ernesto Pellegrini	1984–1995
(Italy) Massimo Moratti	1995–2004
(Italy) Giacinto Facchetti	2004–2006
(Italy) Massimo Moratti	2006–2013
(Indonesia) Erick Thohir	2013–2018
(China) Steven Zhang	2018–2024
(Italy) Giuseppe Marotta	2024–present

=== Managerial history ===
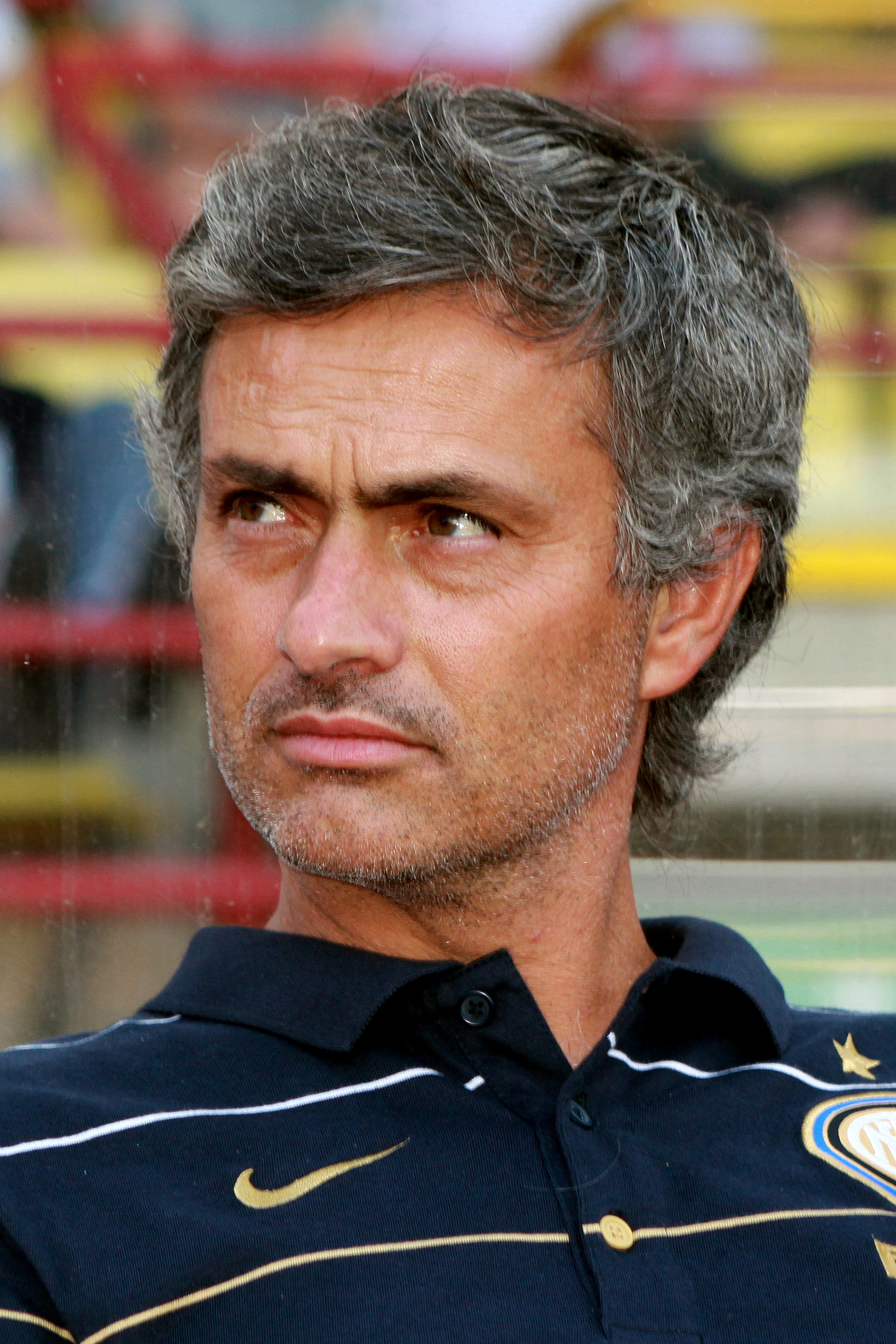
José Mourinho, winner of the first treble in Italian history in the 2009–10 season

Below is a list of Inter coaches from 1909 until the present day.

Name	Nationality	Years
Virgilio Fossati	(Italy)	1909–1915
Nino Resegotti; Francesco Mauro	(Italy)	1919–1920
Bob Spottiswood	(England)	1922–1924
Paolo Schiedler	(Italy)	1924–1926
Árpád Weisz	(Hungary)	1926–1928
József Viola	(Hungary)	1928–1929
Árpád Weisz	(Hungary)	1929–1931
István Tóth	(Hungary)	1931–1932
Árpád Weisz	(Hungary)	1932–1934
Gyula Feldmann	(Hungary)	1934–1936
Albino Carraro	(Italy)	1936
Armando Castellazzi	(Italy)	1936–1938
Tony Cargnelli	(Austria)	1938–1940
Giuseppe Peruchetti; Italo Zamberletti	(Italy)	1940–1941
Ivo Fiorentini	(Italy)	1941–1942
Giovanni Ferrari	(Italy)	1942–1943
Carlo Carcano	(Italy)	1945–1946
Nino Nutrizio	(Italy)	1946
Giuseppe Meazza	(Italy)	1947–1948
Carlo Carcano	(Italy)	1948
Dai Astley	(Wales)	1948
Giulio Cappelli	(Italy)	1949–1950
Aldo Olivieri	(Italy)	1950–1952
Alfredo Foni	(Italy)	1952–1955
Aldo Campatelli	(Italy)	1955
Giuseppe Meazza	(Italy)	1955–1956
Annibale Frossi	(Italy)	1956
Luigi Ferrero	(Italy)	1957
Giuseppe Meazza	(Italy)	1957
Jesse Carver	(England)	1957–1958
Giuseppe Bigogno	(Italy)	1958
Aldo Campatelli	(Italy)	1959–1960
Camillo Achilli	(Italy)	1960
Giulio Cappelli	(Italy)	1960
Helenio Herrera	(Argentina)	1960–1968
Alfredo Foni	(Italy)	1968–1969
Heriberto Herrera	(Paraguay)	1969–1971
Giovanni Invernizzi	(Italy)	1971–1973
Enea Masiero	(Italy)	1973
Helenio Herrera	(Argentina)	1973
Enea Masiero	(Italy)	1974

Name	Nationality	Years
Luis Suárez	(Spain)	1974–1975
Giuseppe Chiappella	(Italy)	1976–1977
Eugenio Bersellini	(Italy)	1977–1982
Rino Marchesi	(Italy)	1982–1983
Luigi Radice	(Italy)	1983–1984
Ilario Castagner	(Italy)	1984–1986
Mario Corso	(Italy)	1986
Giovanni Trapattoni	(Italy)	1986–1991
Corrado Orrico	(Italy)	1991
Luis Suárez	(Spain)	1992
Osvaldo Bagnoli	(Italy)	1992–1994
Giampiero Marini	(Italy)	1994
Ottavio Bianchi	(Italy)	1994–1995
Luis Suárez	(Spain)	1995
Roy Hodgson	(England)	1995–1997
Luciano Castellini	(Italy)	1997
Luigi Simoni	(Italy)	1997–1998
Mircea Lucescu	(Romania)	1998–1999
Luciano Castellini	(Italy)	1999
Roy Hodgson	(England)	1999
Marcello Lippi	(Italy)	1999–2000
Marco Tardelli	(Italy)	2000–2001
Héctor Cúper	(Argentina)	2001–2003
Corrado Verdelli	(Italy)	2003
Alberto Zaccheroni	(Italy)	2003–2004
Roberto Mancini	(Italy)	2004–2008
José Mourinho	(Portugal)	2008–2010
Rafael Benítez	(Spain)	2010
Leonardo	(Brazil)	2010–2011
Gian Piero Gasperini	(Italy)	2011
Claudio Ranieri	(Italy)	2011–2012
Andrea Stramaccioni	(Italy)	2012–2013
Walter Mazzarri	(Italy)	2013–2014
Roberto Mancini	(Italy)	2014–2016
Frank de Boer	(Netherlands)	2016
Stefano Vecchi	(Italy)	2016
Stefano Pioli	(Italy)	2016–2017
Stefano Vecchi	(Italy)	2017
Luciano Spalletti	(Italy)	2017–2019
Antonio Conte	(Italy)	2019–2021
Simone Inzaghi	(Italy)	2021–2025
Cristian Chivu	(Romania)	2025–

== Corporate ==
Inter have varied between 6th and 20th in the Deloitte Football Money League between 1996 and 2026. They placed 11th in the 2026 edition, with €537.5 million in revenue for the 2024–25 season, a rise of 37% on the previous year.

Massimo Moratti took over as president of Inter in 1995, inheriting not just a majority stake but also a legacy passed down from his father, Angelo Moratti. During his tenure, Moratti invested enormous sums of his own wealth to modernize and elevate the club. Estimates suggest he spent between €600 million and €1.5 billion on player transfers alone during his time as majority owner. Marquee signings in the late 90s included Ronaldo and Christian Vieri (for a then-world-record €48 million). Moratti sold a 70% stake to a consortium led by Indonesian businessman Erick Thohir through International Sports Capital for approximately €250 million, valuing the club at around $480 million. Thohir gained majority control, while Massimo Moratti retained a minority stake of around 30%. The deal represented a change of strategy aimed at expanding the club’s presence in Asian markets.

In June 2016, Chinese electronics retailer Suning Commerce Group acquired nearly 70% of Italian football club Inter Milan for €270 million ($307 million), marking the largest takeover of a European football club by a Chinese firm at the time. Thohir retained a minority stake of around 30% and remained club president, while Massimo Moratti, the long-time owner of Inter sold his remaining shares, fully exiting the club. As part of the transaction, Suning also agreed to assume a significant portion of the club’s existing debt.

During the 2020-21 season, the club posted a record loss of €245.6 million (US $285 million) during the COVID interrupted season, the largest ever reported by an Italian club, due to the complete loss of matchday revenue and reduced sponsorship income. As a result, US-based investment firm Oaktree Capital Management guaranteed a US$336 million loan to cover operating expenses, the sum payable back plus interest within three years.

On 22 May 2024, Oaktree assumed ownership of the club with Suning missing the deadline on a €395 million debt payment, resulting in Oaktree's right to take control of the club. This brought more commercial stability, as Inter recorded a net profit of €22.7 million in 2025–26 on revenues of €518 million, a second consecutive profitable year after €35.4 million in 2024–25, the club's first positive result in 15 years. Shareholders' equity returned to positive territory.

== Kit suppliers and shirt sponsors ==
Period	Kit manufacturer	Shirt sponsor (chest)	Shirt sponsor (back)	Shirt sponsor (sleeve)
1979–1981	Puma	None	None	None
1981–1982	Puma	Inno-Hit	None	None
1982–1986	Mecsport	Misura	None	None
1986–1988	Le Coq Sportif	Misura	None	None
1988–1991	Uhlsport	Misura	None	None
1991–1992	Umbro	FitGar	None	None
1992–1995	Umbro	Cesare Fiorucci	None	None
1995–1998	Umbro	Pirelli	None	None
1998–2015	Nike	Pirelli	None	None
2015–2016	Nike	Pirelli (Home) / Driver (Away)	None	None
2016–2021	Nike	Pirelli	Driver	None
2021–2022	Nike	$INTER Fan Token	Lenovo	DigitalBits
2022–2023	Nike	DigitalBits (Matchday 1–32) Paramount+ (Matchday 38 & UEFA Champions League Final)	Lenovo	eBay
2023–2024	Nike	Paramount+	U-Power	eBay
2024–2026	Nike	Betsson.sport	U-Power	Gate.io
2026–	Nike	Betsson.sport	U-Power	BBVA

== See also ==
- Dynasties in Italian football
- European Club Association
- List of world champion football clubs

== Bibliography ==
- Galasso, Vito (2015). L'Inter dalla A alla Z (in Italian). Rome: Newton Compton. ISBN 9788854186989.
- Sarugia, Danilo (2007). Grande Inter. La leggendaria squadra di Moratti e Herrera (in Italian). Milan: Sperling & Kupfer. ISBN 9788860611789.
