= Nubia Technology =

Chinese smartphone manufacturer

Nubia Technology Co., Ltd.
- Industry: Consumer electronics
- Founded: 2015; 11 years ago
- Headquarters: Shenzhen, Guangdong, China
- Area served: Worldwide
- Products: Smartphones

Chinese name
- Simplified Chinese: 努比亚技术有限公司
Transcriptions

Chinese short name
- Simplified Chinese: 努比亚
Transcriptions
- Website: nubia.com/en (Global) nubia.com/index (China)

Nubia Technology Co., Ltd. is a Chinese smartphone manufacturer headquartered in Shenzhen, Guangdong. Originally established as a wholly owned subsidiary of ZTE in 2012, it became an independent company in 2015 and received a significant investment from Suning Holdings Group and Suning Commerce Group in 2016. ZTE reduced its stake in Nubia to 49.9% in 2017. Officially, this meant Nubia was no longer considered a subsidiary of ZTE, but rather an associate company.

In February 2016 Nubia became a sponsor of Jiangsu Suning F.C. for a reported CN¥150 million.

The company hired footballer Cristiano Ronaldo to promote the mobile phone of the company in May 2016.

In 2017, China Daily reported that Nubia would build a factory in Nanchang, Jiangxi Province.

In April 2018, Nubia Technology launched a gaming sub-brand, named REDMAGIC (红魔). REDMAGIC announced its new 5G compatible device REDMAGIC 5G on 12 March 2020, in Shanghai. REDMAGIC is known for being the first smartphone brand to put cooling fans inside their phones. The company also unveiled a partnership with Chinese esport team Royal Never Give Up, to further expand its brand among esport enthusiasts.

On 13 April 2020, the company unveiled a brand new logo as well as its new brand vision.

In March 2022, Nubia unveiled the first gaming phone featuring an under-display camera technology, the REDMAGIC 7 Pro.

In 2023, Nubia released the Red Magic 8S Pro, touted as the strongest gaming phone to date.

In 2024, Nubia released the Red Magic 9S Pro+ with the highest Antutu smartphone score to date. In July 2024, RedMagic announced its entry in the computer category with its first gaming laptop, the Titan 16 Pro, available in China and global markets, while in September, they launched their first gaming tablet, the Nova gaming pad.

== Products ==
=== Smartphone ===
==== RedMagic sub-brand ====
model	SoC	CPU and specifications	GPU	RAM specifications	Storage specifications	Underlying operating system	UI	size	weight	battery capacity	Charging power	Screen specifications	Rear camera	Front camera	Unlocking method	Screen form
RedMagic 11 Pro	Qualcomm Snapdragon 8 Elite Gen 5	Octa-core (2x 4.60 GHz Oryon Prime + 6x 3.80 GHz Oryon Performance)	Adreno 840 (RedCore R4)	12/16/24 GB LPDDR5T	256/512/1024 GB UFS 4.1 Pro	Android 16	REDMAGIC OS 11	163.82 x 76.54 x 8.9 mm	230 g	7500 mAh	Fast charging 80W wired and wireless	6.85 inches FHD+, 144Hz, 1216x2688, 20:9, AMOLED BOE X10, 2000 nits max brightness, 100% DCI-P3	50MP, OIS; 50MP, ultrawide 2MP, macro	16MP under-display (UDC)	Fingerprint (under display, optical)	Notch-less flat display (UDC)
RedMagic 10S Pro	Qualcomm Snapdragon 8 Elite (Leading Version)	Octa-core (2x 4.47 GHz Oryon V2 Phoenix L + 6x 3.53 GHz Oryon V2 Phoenix M)	Adreno 830 (RedCore R3 Pro)	12/16/24 GB LPDDR5T	256/512/1024 GB UFS 4.1 Pro	Android 15	REDMAGIC OS 10	163.42 x 76.14 x 8.9 mm	229 g	7050 mAh	Fast charging up to 100W	6.85 inches FHD+, 144Hz, 1216x2688, 20:9, AMOLED BOE Q9+, 2000 nits max brightness, 100% DCI-P3	50MP, OIS; 50MP, ultrawide 2MP, macro	16MP under-display (UDC)	Fingerprint (under display, optical)	Notch-less flat display (UDC)
RedMagic 10 Pro+	Qualcomm Snapdragon 8 Elite	Octa-core (2x 4.32 GHz Oryon V2 Phoenix L + 6x 3.53 GHz Oryon V2 Phoenix M)	Adreno 830	16/24 GB LPDDR5X	512/1024 GB UFS 4.0 Pro	Android 15	REDMAGIC OS 10	163.4 x 76.1 x 8.9 mm	229 g	7050 mAh	Fast charging 120W	6.85 inches FHD+, 144Hz, 1216x2688, 20:9, AMOLED BOE Q9+, 2000 nits max brightness, 100% DCI-P3	50MP, f/1.9, OIS; 50MP, f/2.2, ultrawide 2MP, f/2.4, macro	16MP under-display (UDC)	Fingerprint (under display, optical)	Notch-less flat display (UDC)
RedMagic 10 Pro	Qualcomm Snapdragon 8 Elite	Octa-core (2x 4.32 GHz Oryon V2 Phoenix L + 6x 3.53 GHz Oryon V2 Phoenix M)	Adreno 830	12/16/24 GB LPDDR5X	256/512/1024 GB UFS 4.1 Pro	Android 15	REDMAGIC OS 10	163.42 x 76.14 x 8.9 mm	229 g	7050 mAh	Fast charging 100W - Chinese Model, 80W - Global Model	6.85 inches FHD+, 144Hz, 1216x2688, 20:9, AMOLED BOE Q9+, 2000 nits max brightness, 100% DCI-P3	50MP, f/1.9, OIS; 50MP, f/2.2, ultrawide 2MP, f/2.4, macro	16MP under-display (UDC)	Fingerprint (under display, optical)	Notch-less flat display (UDC)
RedMagic 9S Pro+	Qualcomm Snapdragon 8 Gen 3 Leading Version	1× 3.40 GHz Kryo Prime (Cortex-X4) + 3× 3.15 GHz Kryo Gold (Cortex-A720) + 2× 2.96 GHz Kryo Gold (Cortex-A720) + 2× 2.27 GHz Kryo Silver (Cortex-A520)	Adreno 750	16/24 GB LPDDR5X	512/1024 GB UFS 4.0	Android 14	REDMAGIC OS 9.5	164 x 76.4 x 8.9 mm	229 g	5500 mAh	Fast charging 165W wired	6.8 inches AMOLED, 120Hz, 1116x2480, 20:9, 1600 nits max brightness, Corning Gorilla Glass 5	50 MP, f/1.9 (wide), OIS; 50 MP, f/2.2 (ultrawide); 2 MP, f/2.4 (macro)	16 MP under-display (UDC)	Fingerprint (under display, optical)	Notch-less flat display (UDC)
RedMagic 9S Pro	Qualcomm Snapdragon 8 Gen 3 Leading Version	1× 3.40 GHz Kryo Prime (Cortex-X4) + 3× 3.15 GHz Kryo Gold (Cortex-A720) + 2× 2.96 GHz Kryo Gold (Cortex-A720) + 2× 2.27 GHz Kryo Silver (Cortex-A520)	Adreno 750	12/16 GB LPDDR5X	256/512 GB UFS 4.0	Android 14	REDMAGIC OS 9.5	164 x 76.4 x 8.9 mm	229 g	6500 mAh	Fast charging 80W wired	6.8 inches AMOLED, 120Hz, 1116x2480, 20:9, 1600 nits max brightness, Corning Gorilla Glass 5	50 MP, f/1.9 (wide), OIS; 50 MP, f/2.2 (ultrawide); 2 MP, f/2.4 (macro)	16 MP under-display (UDC)	Fingerprint (under display, optical)	Notch-less flat display (UDC)
RedMagic 9 Pro+	Qualcomm Snapdragon 8 Gen 3	1× 3.30 GHz Kryo Prime (Cortex-X4) + 3× 3.15 GHz Kryo Gold (Cortex-A720) + 2× 2.96 GHz Kryo Gold (Cortex-A720) + 2× 2.27 GHz Kryo Silver (Cortex-A520)	Adreno 750	16/24 GB LPDDR5X	256/512/1024 GB UFS 4.0	Android 14	REDMAGIC OS 9.0	164 x 76.4 x 8.9 mm	229 g	5500 mAh	Fast charging 165W wired	6.8 inches AMOLED, 120Hz, 1116x2480, 20:9, 1600 nits max brightness, Corning Gorilla Glass 5	50 MP, f/1.9 (wide), OIS; 50 MP, f/2.2 (ultrawide); 2 MP, f/2.4 (macro)	16 MP under-display (UDC)	Fingerprint (under display, optical)	Notch-less flat display (UDC)
RedMagic 9 Pro	Qualcomm Snapdragon 8 Gen 3	1× 3.30 GHz Kryo Prime (Cortex-X4) + 3× 3.15 GHz Kryo Gold (Cortex-A720) + 2× 2.96 GHz Kryo Gold (Cortex-A720) + 2× 2.27 GHz Kryo Silver (Cortex-A520)	Adreno 750	8/12/16 GB LPDDR5X	256/512 GB UFS 4.0	Android 14	REDMAGIC OS 9.0	164 x 76.4 x 8.9 mm	229 g	6500 mAh	Fast charging 80W wired	6.8 inches AMOLED, 120Hz, 1116x2480, 20:9, 1600 nits max brightness, Corning Gorilla Glass 5	50 MP, f/1.9 (wide), OIS; 50 MP, f/2.2 (ultrawide); 2 MP, f/2.4 (macro)	16 MP under-display (UDC)	Fingerprint (under display, optical)	Notch-less flat display (UDC)
RedMagic 8S Pro+	Qualcomm Snapdragon 8 Gen 2 Leading Version	Cortex-X3 (3.36 GHz) + 2× 2.8 GHz Cortex-A715 + 2× 2.8 GHz Cortex-A710 + 3× 2.0 GHz Cortex-A510	Adreno 740	16/24 GB LPDDR5X	256/512/1024 GB UFS 4.0	Android 13.0	REDMAGIC OS 8.0	163.98 x 76.35 x 8.9 mm	230 g	5000 mAh	Fast charging 165W wired (Chinese Model)	6.8 inches FHD+, 120Hz, 960Hz multi-touch sampling rate, 1116x2480, 20:9, AMOLED, Corning Gorilla Glass 5, 100% DCI-P3, color accuracy △E＜1	Samsung GN 5 sensor 1/1.57"; 50MP, 82°, f/1.88 8MP, 120°, f/2.2 2MP, 78°, f/2.4 7680x4320@30fps	16MP, 2nd generation under-display-camera (UDC); Pixel Size: 1.12μm Aperture: 2.0	Fingerprint (under display, optical)	Notch-less flat display (UDC)
RedMagic 8S Pro	Qualcomm Snapdragon 8 Gen 2 Leading Version	Cortex-X3 (3.36 GHz) + 2× 2.8 GHz Cortex-A715 + 2× 2.8 GHz Cortex-A710 + 3× 2.0 GHz Cortex-A510	Adreno 740	12/16 GB LPDDR5X	256/512 GB UFS 4.0	Android 13.0	REDMAGIC OS 8.0	163.98 x 76.35 x 9.47 mm	228 g	6000 mAh	Fast charging 80W - Chinese Model, 60W - Global Model	6.8 inches FHD+, 120Hz, 960Hz multi-touch sampling rate, 1116x2480, 20:9, AMOLED, 1300 nits max brightness, Corning Gorilla Glass 5, 100% DCI-P3, color accuracy △E＜1	Samsung GN 5 sensor 1/1.57"; 50MP, 82°, f/1.88 8MP, 120°, f/2.2 2MP, 78°, f/2.4 7680x4320@30fps	16MP, 2nd generation under-display-camera (UDC); Pixel Size: 1.12μm Aperture: 2.0	Fingerprint (under display, optical)	Notch-less flat display (UDC)
RedMagic 8 Pro+	Qualcomm Snapdragon 8 Gen 2	Cortex-X3 (3.20 GHz) + 2× 2.8 GHz Cortex-A715 + 2× 2.8 GHz Cortex-A710 + 3× 2.0 GHz Cortex-A510	Adreno 740	12/16 GB LPDDR5X	256/512/1024 GB UFS 4.0	Android 13.0	REDMAGIC OS 6.0	164.5 x 77 x 8.9 mm	230 g	5000 mAh	Fast charging 165W wired (Chinese Model)	6.8 inches FHD+, 120Hz, 1116x2480, 20:9, AMOLED, 1300 nits max brightness, Corning Gorilla Glass 5	50MP, f/1.9 (wide); 8MP, f/2.2 (ultrawide); 2MP, f/2.4 (macro)	16MP, under-display-camera (UDC), f/2.0	Fingerprint (under display, optical)	Notch-less flat display (UDC)
RedMagic 8 Pro	Qualcomm Snapdragon 8 Gen 2	Cortex-X3 (3.20 GHz) + 2× 2.8 GHz Cortex-A715 + 2× 2.8 GHz Cortex-A710 + 3× 2.0 GHz Cortex-A510	Adreno 740	8/12/16 GB LPDDR5X	128/256/512 GB UFS 4.0	Android 13.0	REDMAGIC OS 6.0	164.5 x 77 x 9.5 mm	228 g	6000 mAh	Fast charging 80W - Chinese Model, 65W - Global Model	6.8 inches FHD+, 120Hz, 1116x2480, 20:9, AMOLED, 1300 nits max brightness, Corning Gorilla Glass 5	50MP, f/1.9 (wide); 8MP, f/2.2 (ultrawide); 2MP, f/2.4 (macro)	16MP, under-display-camera (UDC), f/2.0	Fingerprint (under display, optical)	Notch-less flat display (UDC)
RedMagic 7S Pro	Qualcomm Snapdragon 8+ Gen 1	Cortex-X2 (3.19 GHz) + 3× 2.75 GHz Cortex-A710 + 4× 1.80 GHz Cortex-A510	Adreno 730	12/16/18 GB LPDDR5	256/512/1024 GB UFS 3.1	Android 12	REDMAGIC OS 5.5	166.3 x 77.1 x 10 mm	235 g	5000 mAh	Fast charging 135W - Chinese Model, 65W - Global Model	6.8 inches FHD+, 120Hz, 1080x2400, 20:9, AMOLED, 600 nits max brightness, Corning Gorilla Glass 5	64MP, f/1.8 (wide); 8MP, f/2.2 (ultrawide); 2MP, f/2.4 (macro)	16MP, under-display-camera (UDC), f/2.0	Fingerprint (under display, optical)	Notch-less flat display (UDC)
RedMagic 7S	Qualcomm Snapdragon 8+ Gen 1	Cortex-X2 (3.19 GHz) + 3× 2.75 GHz Cortex-A710 + 4× 1.80 GHz Cortex-A510	Adreno 730	8/12/16 GB LPDDR5	128/256/512 GB UFS 3.1	Android 12	REDMAGIC OS 5.5	170.6 x 78.3 x 9.5 mm	215 g	4500 mAh	Fast charging 120W wired	6.8 inches FHD+, 165Hz, 1080x2400, 20:9, AMOLED, 700 nits max brightness, Corning Gorilla Glass 5	64MP, f/1.8 (wide); 8MP, f/2.2 (ultrawide); 2MP, f/2.4 (macro)	8MP, f/2.0 (wide)	Fingerprint (under display, optical)	Notch-less flat display (symmetric bezels)
RedMagic 7 Pro	Qualcomm Snapdragon 8 Gen 1	Cortex-X2 (3.00 GHz) + 3× 2.50 GHz Cortex-A710 + 4× 1.80 GHz Cortex-A510	Adreno 730	12/16/18 GB LPDDR5	128/256/512/1024 GB UFS 3.1	Android 12	REDMAGIC OS 5.0	166.3 x 77.1 x 10 mm	235 g	5000 mAh	Fast charging 135W - Chinese Model, 65W - Global Model	6.8 inches FHD+, 120Hz, 1080x2400, 20:9, AMOLED, 600 nits max brightness, Corning Gorilla Glass 5	64MP, f/1.8 (wide); 8MP, f/2.2 (ultrawide); 2MP, f/2.4 (macro)	16MP, under-display-camera (UDC), f/2.0	Fingerprint (under display, optical)	Notch-less flat display (UDC)
RedMagic 7	Qualcomm Snapdragon 8 Gen 1	Cortex-X2 (3.00 GHz) + 3× 2.50 GHz Cortex-A710 + 4× 1.80 GHz Cortex-A510	Adreno 730	8/12/16/18 GB LPDDR5	128/256/512 GB UFS 3.1	Android 12	REDMAGIC OS 5.0	170.6 x 78.3 x 9.5 mm	215 g	4500 mAh	Fast charging 120W - Chinese Model, 65W - Global Model	6.8 inches FHD+, 165Hz, 1080x2400, 20:9, AMOLED, 700 nits max brightness, Corning Gorilla Glass 5	64MP, f/1.8 (wide); 8MP, f/2.2 (ultrawide); 2MP, f/2.4 (macro)	8MP, f/2.0 (wide)	Fingerprint (under display, optical)	Notch-less flat display (symmetric bezels)
Nubia RedMagic 6S Pro	Qualcomm Snapdragon 888 Plus	Cortex-X1 (2.995 GHz) + 3× 2.42 GHz Cortex-A78 + 4× 1.80 GHz Cortex-A55	Adreno 660	12/16/18 GB LPDDR5	128/256/512 GB UFS 3.1	Android 11	RedMagic OS 4.5	169.9 x 77.2 x 9.5 mm	215 g	5,050 mAh	Fast charging 120W - Chinese Model, 66W - Global Model	1080 x 2400 pixels, 20:9 ratio (~387 ppi density), 6.8 inches, 111.6 cm^{2} (~85.1% screen-to-body ratio), AMOLED, 1B colors, 165 Hz, 700 nits (typ)	64 MP, f/1.8, 26mm (wide), 1/1.97", 0.7 μm, PDAF; 8 MP, f/2.0, 120˚, 13mm (ultrawide), 1/4.0", 1.12 μm 2 MP, (macro)	8 MP, f/2.0, (wide), 1/4.0", 1.12 μm	Fingerprint (under display, optical)	Notch-less flat display (symmetric bezels)
Nubia RedMagic 6 Pro	Qualcomm Snapdragon 888	Cortex-X1 (2.84 GHz) + 3× 2.42 GHz Cortex-A78 + 4× 1.80 GHz Cortex-A55	Adreno 660	12/16/18 GB LPDDR5	128/256/512 GB UFS 3.1	Android 11	Redmagic 4.0	169 x 77.1 x 9.8 mm	220 g	4500 mAh (China) / 5050 mAh (Global)	Fast charging 120W (China) / 66W (Global); Power Delivery 3.0; Quick Charge 5	1080 x 2400 pixels, 20:9 ratio AMOLED, 1B colors, 165 Hz, 500 Hz single touch sampling rate, 360 Hz multi-touch sampling rate	64 MP, f/1.8, 26mm (wide), 1/1.72", 0.8 μm, PDAF; 8 MP, f/2.0, 120˚, 13mm (ultrawide), 1.12 μm 2 MP, (macro)	8 MP, f/2.0, (wide), 1.12 μm	Fingerprint (under display, optical)	Notch-less flat display (symmetric bezels)
Nubia RedMagic 6	Qualcomm Snapdragon 888	Cortex-X1 (2.84 GHz) + 3× 2.42 GHz Cortex-A78 + 4× 1.80 GHz Cortex-A55	Adreno 660	8/12 GB LPDDR5	128/256 GB UFS 3.1	Android 11	Redmagic 4.0	169 x 77.1 x 9.7 mm	220 g	5050 mAh	Fast charging 66W wired	1080 x 2400 pixels, 20:9 ratio AMOLED, 1B colors, 165 Hz, 500 Hz single touch sampling rate, 360 Hz multi-touch sampling rate	64 MP, f/1.8, 26mm (wide); 8 MP, f/2.0, 120˚, 13mm (ultrawide); 2 MP, (macro)	8 MP, f/2.0, (wide)	Fingerprint (under display, optical)	Notch-less flat display (symmetric bezels)
Nubia RedMagic 6R	Qualcomm Snapdragon 888	Cortex-X1 (2.84 GHz) + 3× 2.42 GHz Cortex-A78 + 4× 1.80 GHz Cortex-A55	Adreno 660	6/8/12 GB LPDDR5	128/256 GB UFS 3.1	Android 11	Redmagic 4.0	163 x 75.3 x 7.8 mm	186 g	4200 mAh	Fast charging 55W (China) / 30W (Global)	1080 x 2400 pixels, 20:9 ratio AMOLED, 1B colors, 144 Hz	64 MP, f/1.8 (wide); 8 MP, f/2.2 (ultrawide); 5 MP, f/2.4 (macro); 2 MP, f/2.4 (depth)	16 MP, f/2.0, (wide)	Fingerprint (under display, optical)	Notch-less flat display (punch-hole)
Nubia RedMagic 5S	Qualcomm Snapdragon 865	Eight cores, Kryo 585, 1 + 3 + 4 cores (2.84 GHz + 2.42 GHz + 1.80 GHz)	Adreno 650	8/12/16 GB LPDDR5	128/256 GB UFS 3.1	Android 10	Redmagic OS 3.0	168.6 x 78 x 9.8 mm	220 g	4500 mAh	USB-C, 55W	6.65", 2340x1080, 144 Hz AMOLED	64 MP main camera + 8 MP ultra wide angle + 2 MP macro	8MP	Under-screen optical fingerprint	Notch-less flat display (symmetric bezels)
Nubia RedMagic 5G	Qualcomm Snapdragon 865	Eight cores, Kryo 585, 1 + 3 + 4 cores (2.84 GHz + 2.42 GHz + 1.80 GHz)	Adreno 650	8/12/16 GB LPDDR5	128/256 GB UFS 3.0	Android 10	Redmagic OS 3.0	168.6 x 78 x 9.8 mm	218g	4500 mAh	USB-C, 55W	6.65", 2340x1080, 144 Hz AMOLED	Three lenses at the rear 64 MP main camera + 8 MP ultra wide angle + 2 MP macro	8MP	Under-screen optical fingerprint	Notch-less flat display (symmetric bezels)
Nubia RedMagic 3S	Qualcomm Snapdragon 855+	Eight cores, Kryo 485, 1 + 3 + 4 cores (2.96 GHz + 2.42 GHz + 1.80 GHz)	Adreno 640	8/12 GB	128/256 GB UFS 3.0	Android 9.0 "Pie"	Redmagic OS 2.1	171.7 x 78.5 x 9.7 mm	215g	5000 mAh	USB-C, 27W	6.65", 2340x1080, 90 Hz AMOLED	48 MP main camera	16MP	Back-mounted fingerprint	Notch-less flat display (symmetric bezels)
Nubia RedMagic 3	Qualcomm Snapdragon 855	Eight cores, Kryo 485, 1 + 3 + 4 cores (2.84 GHz + 2.42 GHz + 1.80 GHz)	Adreno 640	6/8/12 GB	64/128/256 GB	Android 9.0 "Pie"	Redmagic OS 2.0	171.7 x 78.5 x 9.7 mm	215g	5000 mAh	USB-C, 27W	6.65", 2340x1080, 90 Hz AMOLED	48 MP main camera	16MP	Back-mounted fingerprint	Notch-less flat display (symmetric bezels)
Nubia RedMagic Mars	Qualcomm Snapdragon 845	Octa-core (4x 2.80 GHz Kryo 385 Gold + 4x 1.80 GHz Kryo 385 Silver)	Adreno 630	6/8/10 GB	64/128/256 GB	Android 9.0 "Pie"	Redmagic OS 1.6	158.3 x 75 x 9.8 mm	193g	3800 mAh	USB-C, 18W	6.0", 2160x1080, LTPS IPS LCD	16 MP, f/1.8, PDAF	8MP, f/2.0	Back-mounted fingerprint	Notch-less flat display (symmetric bezels)
Nubia RedMagic	Qualcomm Snapdragon 835	Octa-core (4x 2.35 GHz Kryo + 4x 1.90 GHz Kryo)	Adreno 540	8 GB	128 GB	Android 8.1 "Oreo"	Redmagic OS 1.0	158.1 x 74.9 x 9.7 mm	185g	3800 mAh	USB-C, 18W	6.0", 2160x1080, LTPS IPS LCD	24 MP, f/1.7, PDAF	8MP, f/2.0	Back-mounted fingerprint	Notch-less flat display (symmetric bezels)

==== Nubia ====
model	SoC	CPU and specifications	GPU	RAM specifications	Storage specifications	Underlying operating system	UI	size	weight	battery capacity	Charging power	Screen specifications	Rear camera	Front camera	Unlocking method	Screen form
Nubia Z80 Ultra	Qualcomm Snapdragon 8 Elite Gen 5	Octa-core (2x 4.60 GHz Oryon Prime + 6x 3.80 GHz Oryon Performance)	Adreno 840	12/16 GB LPDDR5X	256/512/1024 GB UFS 4.1	Android 16	MyOS 16	164.5 x 77.2 x 8.6 mm	227 g	7200 mAh	Fast charging 80W wired and wireless	6.85 inches AMOLED, 144Hz, 1216x2688, 20:9	50 MP, f/1.7 (35mm), OIS + 50 MP, f/1.8 (ultrawide) + 64 MP, f/2.48 (periscope telephoto), OIS	16 MP under-display (UDC)	Fingerprint (under display, ultrasonic)	Notch-less flat display (UDC)
Nubia Neo 3 GT 5G	Unisoc Tiger T9100	Octa-core (1x 2.7 GHz Cortex-A76 + 3x 2.3 GHz Cortex-A76 + 4x 2.1 GHz Cortex-A55)	Mali-G57	8/12 GB	256 GB UFS 3.1	Android 15	MyOS 15	166.0 x 76.1 x 8.5 mm	208 g	6000 mAh	Fast charging 80W wired	6.8 inches OLED, 120Hz, 1080x2392, 20:9	50 MP, f/1.8 (wide) + 2 MP, f/2.4 (depth)	16 MP, f/2.0	Fingerprint (side-mounted)	Punch-hole display
Nubia Z70S Ultra (incl. Photographer Edition)	Qualcomm Snapdragon 8 Elite	Octa-core (2x 4.32 GHz Oryon V2 Phoenix L + 6x 3.53 GHz Oryon V2 Phoenix M)	Adreno 830	12/16/24 GB LPDDR5X	256/512/1024 GB UFS 4.0 Pro	Android 15	MyOS 15	164 x 76.3 x 8.6 mm	241 g	6000 mAh	Fast charging 80W wired	6.8 inches AMOLED, 120Hz, 1216x2688, 20:9, 1500 nits max brightness	50 MP, f/1.6 (35mm), OIS + 50 MP, f/2.0 (ultrawide) + 64 MP, f/3.3 (85mm periscope)	16 MP under-display (UDC)	Fingerprint (under display, optical)	Notch-less flat display (UDC)
Nubia Z70S Pro	Qualcomm Snapdragon 8 Elite	Octa-core (2x 4.32 GHz Oryon V2 Phoenix L + 6x 3.53 GHz Oryon V2 Phoenix M)	Adreno 830	12/16 GB LPDDR5X	256/512/1024 GB UFS 4.0	Android 15	MyOS 15	163.6 x 75.9 x 8.7 mm	225 g	5500 mAh	Fast charging 80W wired	6.78 inches AMOLED, 120Hz, 1260x2800, 20:9	50 MP, f/1.6 (35mm), OIS + 50 MP, f/2.0 (ultrawide) + 8 MP (telephoto)	16 MP, f/2.4	Fingerprint (under display, optical)	Punch-hole display
Nubia Neo 2 5G	Unisoc T820	Octa-core (1x 2.7 GHz Cortex-A76 + 3x 2.3 GHz Cortex-A76 + 4x 2.1 GHz Cortex-A55)	Mali-G57 PB4	8 GB	256 GB UFS 3.1	Android 13	MyOS 13	166 x 76.1 x 8.5 mm	208 g	6000 mAh	Fast charging 33W wired	6.72 inches IPS LCD, 120Hz, 1080x2400, 20:9	50 MP, f/1.8 (wide) + 2 MP, f/2.4 (depth)	16 MP, f/2.0	Fingerprint (side-mounted)	Punch-hole display
Nubia Z60 Ultra	Qualcomm Snapdragon 8 Gen 3	1× 3.30 GHz Kryo Prime (Cortex-X4) + 3× 3.15 GHz Kryo Gold (Cortex-A720) + 2× 2.96 GHz Kryo Gold (Cortex-A720) + 2× 2.27 GHz Kryo Silver (Cortex-A520)	Adreno 750	8/12/16/24 GB LPDDR5X	256/512/1024 GB UFS 4.0	Android 14	MyOS 14	163.9 x 76.3 x 8.8 mm	246 g	6000 mAh	Fast charging 80W wired	6.8 inches AMOLED, 120Hz, 1116x2480, 20:9, 1500 nits max brightness	50 MP, f/1.6 (35mm), OIS + 50 MP, f/1.8 (18mm ultrawide) + 64 MP, f/3.3 (85mm periscope)	12 MP or 16 MP under-display (UDC)	Fingerprint (under display, optical)	Notch-less flat display (UDC)
Nubia Z50 Ultra	Qualcomm Snapdragon 8 Gen 2	Cortex-X3 (3.20 GHz) + 2× 2.8 GHz Cortex-A715 + 2× 2.8 GHz Cortex-A710 + 3× 2.0 GHz Cortex-A510	Adreno 740	8/12/16 GB LPDDR5X	256/512/1024 GB UFS 4.0	Android 13	MyOS 13	163.9 x 76.3 x 8.3 mm	228 g	5000 mAh	Fast charging 80W wired	6.8 inches AMOLED, 120Hz, 1116x2480, 20:9, 1500 nits max brightness	64 MP, f/1.6 (35mm), OIS + 50 MP, f/2.2 (14mm ultrawide) + 64 MP, f/3.3 (85mm periscope)	16 MP under-display (UDC)	Fingerprint (under display, optical)	Notch-less flat display (UDC)
Nubia Z40 Pro	Qualcomm Snapdragon 8 Gen 1	Cortex-X2 (3.00 GHz) + 3× 2.50 GHz Cortex-A710 + 4× 1.80 GHz Cortex-A510	Adreno 730	8/12/16 GB LPDDR5	128/256/512/1024 GB UFS 3.1	Android 12	MyOS 12	161.9 x 72.9 x 8.4 mm	199 g	5000 mAh	Fast charging 80W wired	6.67 inches AMOLED, 144Hz, 1080x2400, 20:9	64 MP, f/1.6 (35mm), OIS + 50 MP, f/2.2 (14mm ultrawide) + 8 MP, f/3.4 (125mm periscope)	16 MP, f/2.5	Fingerprint (under display, optical)	Curved punch-hole display
Nubia Z30 Pro	Qualcomm Snapdragon 888 5G	Cortex-X1 (2.84 GHz) + 3× 2.42 GHz Cortex-A78 + 4× 1.80 GHz Cortex-A55	Adreno 660	8/12/16 GB LPDDR5	256/512 GB UFS 3.1	Android 11	Nubia UI 9.0	161.8 x 73 x 8.5 mm	198 g	4200 mAh	Fast charging 120W wired	6.67 inches AMOLED, 144Hz, 1080x2400, 20:9	64 MP, f/1.6 (wide) + 64 MP, f/1.9 (standard) + 64 MP, f/2.2 (ultrawide) + 8 MP, f/3.4 (123mm periscope)	16 MP	Fingerprint (under display, optical)	Curved punch-hole display
Nubia Play	Qualcomm Snapdragon 765G	Eight cores, Kryo 475, 1 + 1 + 6 cores (2.4 GHz + 2.2 GHz + 1.8 GHz)	Adreno 620	6/8 GB	128/256 GB UFS 2.1	Android 10	Nubia UI 8.0	171.7 x 78.5 x 9.1 mm	210 g	5100 mAh	USB-C, 30W	6.65", 2340x1080, 144 Hz AMOLED	48 MP main camera + 8 MP ultra wide angle + 2 MP macro + 2 MP depth	12MP	Under-screen optical fingerprint	Notch-less flat display (symmetric bezels)
Nubia Z20	Qualcomm Snapdragon 855+	Eight cores, Kryo 485, 1 + 3 + 4 cores (2.96 GHz + 2.42 GHz + 1.80 GHz)	Adreno 640	6/8 GB	128/512 GB UFS 3.0	Android 9.0 "Pie"	Nubia UI 7	158.6 x 75.2 x 9.2 mm	186g	4000 mAh	USB-C, 27W	6.42", 2340x1080, AMOLED + Secondary: 5.1", 1520x720, AMOLED	Dual screen, front and rear camera in one, three cameras: 48 MP main + 16 MP ultra wide + 8 MP telephoto	Uses main cameras	Double side fingerprints	Dual screen notch-less display

===== Neo =====
Gaming and esports products of a lower tier than RedMagic.

- Neo
- Neo 2
- Neo 3
- Neo 3 GT
- Neo 5
- Neo 5 Pro
- Neo 5 GT
