= Redmagic =

Gaming-focused smartphone manufacturer

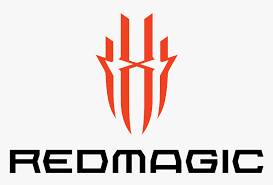
- Type: Subsidiary
- Industry: Consumer electronics
- Founded: 2018
- Founder: Nubia Technology
- Area served: Worldwide
- Products: Gaming smartphones, gaming accessories
- Brands: DAO (氘, lit. 'Deuterium')
- Parent: Nubia Technology
- Website: redmagic.gg

Redmagic (styled as REDMAGIC, Chinese: 红魔; pinyin: Hóngmó; lit. 'Red demon') is a Chinese consumer electronics brand headquartered in Shenzhen, Guangdong, specializing in gaming smartphones and related accessories. The brand was launched in 2018 as a sub-brand of Nubia Technology, itself an affiliate of ZTE Corporation. Redmagic focuses on developing gaming-oriented smartphones. The brand competes with other gaming phone brands, such as ROG Phone, Black Shark and Legion. Its operating system, branded as RedMagicOS, is closed source. REDMAGIC products do not have direct, official shipping to many countries worldwide, particularly in regions like South America, Africa, parts of Asia, and Oceania (including Australia).

== History ==
=== Founding and early years (2018–2019) ===
Redmagic was established in April 2018 by Nubia Technology to target the gaming smartphone market. Its first device, the Redmagic Phone, had a design with RGB lighting and an ergonomic build.

The Redmagic Mars was released in early 2019, introducing shoulder triggers and liquid cooling technology. The device received the Best of CES 2019 awards from tech media such as Android Authority, Android Headlines and PCMag.

=== Expansion (2020–2023) ===
The Redmagic 5G in 2020 was one of the first smartphones in the world to have a 144 Hz refresh rate display, an internal cooling fan and 5G connectivity.

The subsequent Redmagic 6 series, launched in 2021, is the first smartphone to include a display with a 165 Hz refresh rate, as well as an improved cooling fan (up to 18,500 Tr/min instead of 16,000).

By 2023, the Redmagic 8 Pro featured Qualcomm's Snapdragon 8 Gen 2 chipset and a 6000mAh battery, highlighting the company's commitment to high performance and extended gaming sessions.

Towards the end of 2023, Redmagic released the Redmagic 9 Pro, featuring Qualcomm's Snapdragon 8 Gen 3 chipset, a 6,500 mAh battery and the ICE 13 cooling system capable of lowering down the device temperature by up to 18 °C.

=== Latest developments (2024) ===
In November 2024, Redmagic launched the Redmagic 10 Pro, a device powered by the Snapdragon 8 Elite processor. It has a 144 Hz AMOLED display, customizable shoulder triggers, and an advanced cooling system, ICE-X.

=== Glasses-free 3D ===
In 2024 Nubia launched the RedMagic Tablet 3D Explorer Edition geared more for entertainment with an Autostereoscopic display, dual 3D cameras and eye-tracking.

== Products ==
=== Redmagic ===
==== Smartphones ====
- Redmagic (2018): The brand's debut device, featuring RGB lighting and an active cooling system.
- Redmagic Mars (2019): The device features gaming shoulder triggers.
- Redmagic 3 Series (2019): The device introduced an active cooling fan and liquid cooling technology with a 90 Hz refresh rate.
- Redmagic 5G (2020): The device features a 144 Hz refresh rate display.
- Redmagic 6 Series (2021): The device featured a 165 Hz refresh rate display.
- Redmagic 7 Series: This devices includes a display with camera under display technology.
- Redmagic 8 Pro (2023): Equipped with Snapdragon 8 Gen 2 and a 6000mAh battery.
- Redmagic 10 Pro (2024): Equipped with Snapdragon 8 Elite, 144 Hz AMOLED display, and a 7050 mAh battery.
- Redmagic 10S Pro (2025): Equipped with Snapdragon 8 Elite Leading Version with RedCore R3 Pro, 144 Hz AMOLED display, and a 7050 mAh battery.
- Redmagic 11 series
  - Redmagic 11 Pro (2025): Equipped with Snapdragon 8 Elite Gen 5 with REDMAGIC RedCore R4 chip, 144 Hz AMOLED display, and a 7500 mAh battery. World's first mass-produced phone with built-in water pump.
  - 11 Pro (China)
  - 11 Pro+
  - 11 Air
  - 11 Pro Golden Saga (Limited Edition Bundle)
- Redmagic 11S series
  - 11S Pro
  - 11S Pro (China)
  - 11S Pro+

==== Gaming laptops and tablets ====
- In August 2024, Redmagic introduced its new gaming laptop, the Redmagic Titan 16 Pro.
- In October 2024, the company launched the Nova Gaming Tablet.
- Astra Gaming Tablet launched on June 12, 2025. The Astra is positioned as a direct competitor to the Lenovo Legion Tab, with prices starting around $549 or £439 for lower-tier models.
  - Astra Golden Saga (Limited Edition Bundle) launched 2026

=== Dao ===
- Dao 165w GaN
- Dao 80w wireless stand
- Dao 80w GaN
- Dao energy cube 3-in-1 65w GaN
- Dao vita power 22.5w
- Dao TWS (Cyberbuds)

== Reception ==
Redmagic's products have been noted for their competitive pricing and gaming-focused innovations. However, reviews often note trade-offs in non-gaming features, such as camera performance and software updates, compared to mainstream smartphones.

Limited Retail Availability:

Unlike Apple, Samsung, or even Lenovo, REDMAGIC products are harder to find in the UK and are only sold on a handful of websites such as Amazon (company) and CeX (A British second hand electronics store). Most sales are online imports, which reduces visibility to mainstream shoppers. Some users have reported delays and issues with shipping when ordering REDMAGIC products through the official UK website, particularly compared with larger retailers such as Amazon and CEX. There are anecdotal reports of stock sell‑outs and availability problems in Europe and other regions, but these are user comments and not verifiable sales figures.

The Redmagic 10 Pro, in particular, has drawn attention for its mobile gaming performance at a lower price than competitors, although Wired's product review platform warned that "nongamers should look elsewhere". "Assuming you don't mind the enormous, angular design, which isn't very pocket-friendly, you may balk at the slightly janky software, the inconsistent camera performance, or the lack of wireless charging," the review said.

== See also ==
- Nubia Technology
- ZTE Corporation
