= Suning =

Suning may refer to:

- Suning.com, a Chinese retailer, originally corner Jiangsu Road and Ninghai Road, co-founded by Zhang Jindong, was known as Suning Appliance Co., Ltd. and Suning Commerce Group Co., Ltd.
- Suning Holdings Group, the fourth largest shareholder of Suning.com, a wholly owned subsidiary of Zhang Jindong, a conglomerate
- Suning Appliance Group, the second largest shareholder of Suning.com, a real estate and holding company whose majority owners include Zhang Jindong
  - Jiangsu F.C., a defunct football club once owned by Suning Appliance Group Co., Ltd.
- Suning Real Estate, a Chinese real estate company owned by Zhang Jindong
- Suning Universal, a Chinese real estate company, chaired by the elder brother of the co-founder of Suning.com, Zhang Guiping
- Suning (esports), a Chinese professional esports organization
- Suning County, Hebei

== See also ==
- Suning Plaza (disambiguation)
- Nanjing Olympic Suning Tower
- Su Ning, Chinese army officer
- Suining, city in Sichuan, China
- Sunning (disambiguation)
- Sunwing (disambiguation)
