= History of Inter Milan =

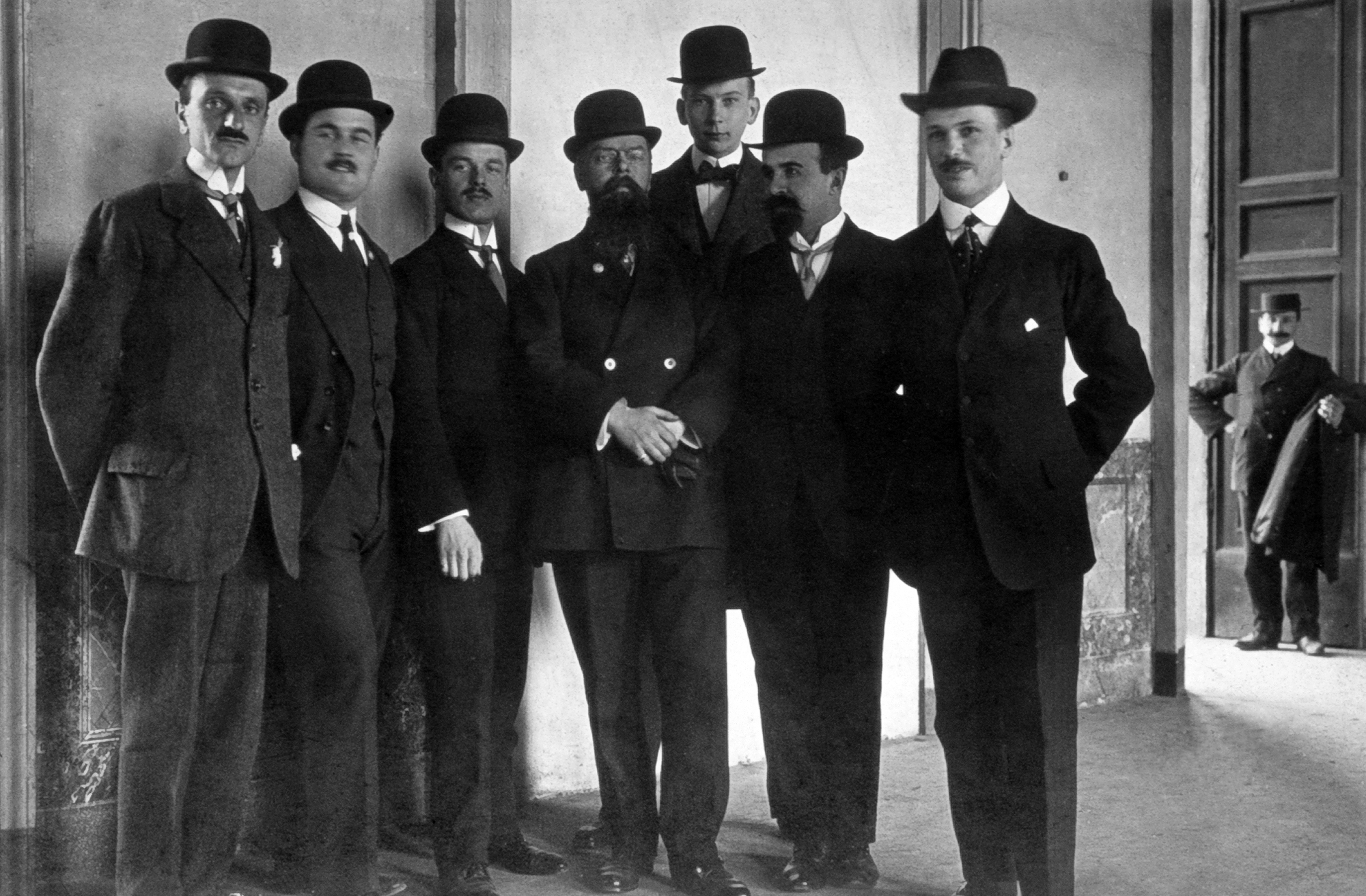

This is the history of Football Club Internazionale Milano, commonly referred to as Internazionale or simply Inter, and colloquially known as Inter Milan outside of Italy, a professional Italian football club based in Milan, Lombardy.

== Foundation and early years ==
The club was founded on March 9th 1908 as Foot-Ball Club Internazionale following a schism within Milan Cricket and Football Club (44 members). A group of Italians and Swiss (Giorgio Muggiani, a painter who also designed the club's logo; Bossard; Lana; Bertoloni; De Olma; Enrico Hintermann; Arturo Hintermann; Carlo Hintermann; Pietro Dell'Oro; Hugo and Hans Rietmann; Voelkel; Maner; Wipf; and Carlo Ardussi) were unhappy with the preponderance of Italians in the Milan team and broke away from it, leading to the creation of Internazionale. The name of the club derives from the wish of its founding members to accept foreign players without limits as well as Italians.

"Questa notte splendida darà i colori al nostro stemma: il nero e l'azzurro sullo sfondo d'oro delle stelle. Si chiamerà Internazionale, perchè noi siamo fratelli del mondo."

— Giorgio Muggiani, 9 March 1908, Milan

"This wonderful night bestows us with the colours of our crest: black and blue against a gilded backdrop of stars. It shall be called International, because we are brothers of the world."

— Giorgio Muggiani, 9 March 1908, Milan

The club won its very first Scudetto (championship) in 1910 and its second in 1920. The captain and coach of the first Scudetto was Virgilio Fossati, who was killed in World War I.

== Ambrosiana-Inter ==
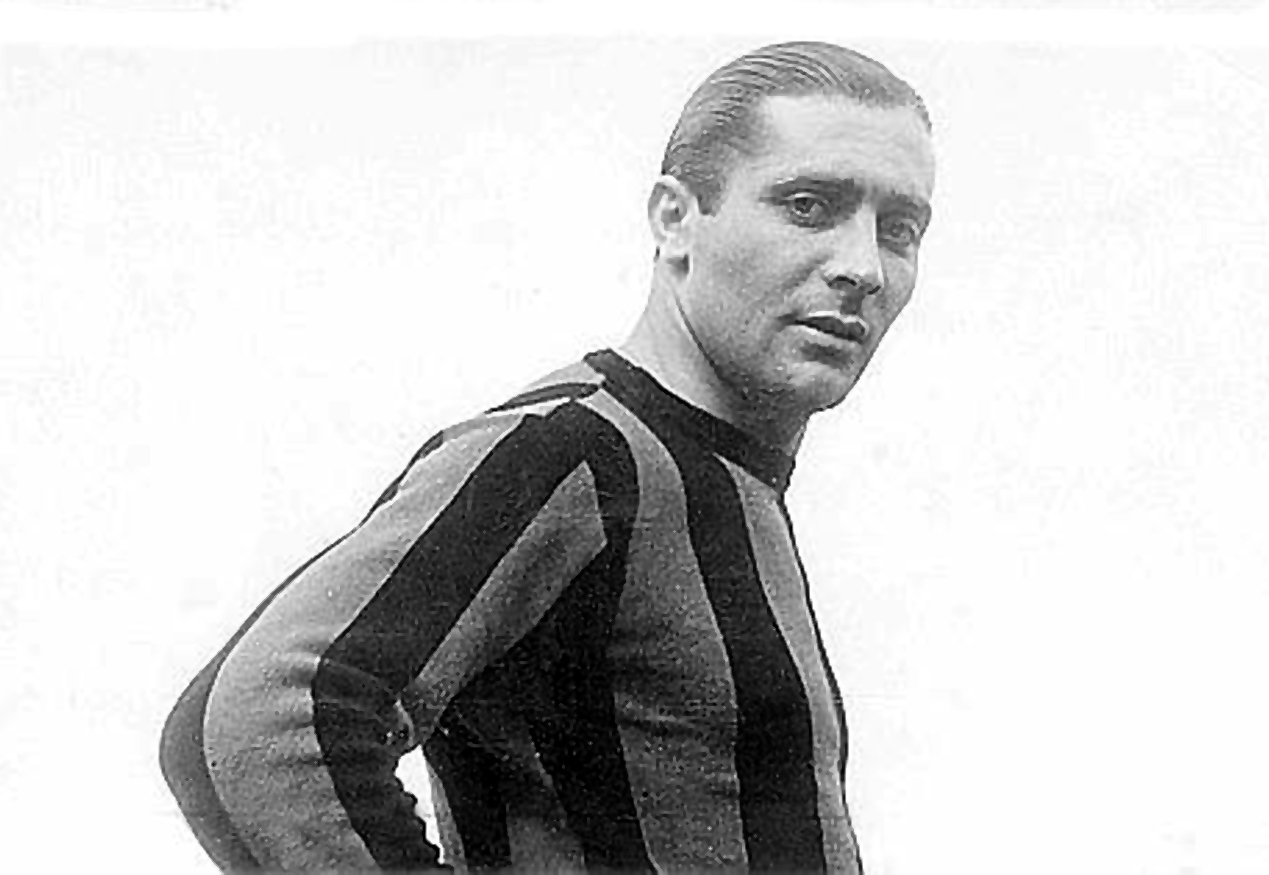
Meazza still holds the record for the most goals scored in a debut season in Serie A, with 31 goals in his first season (1929–30).

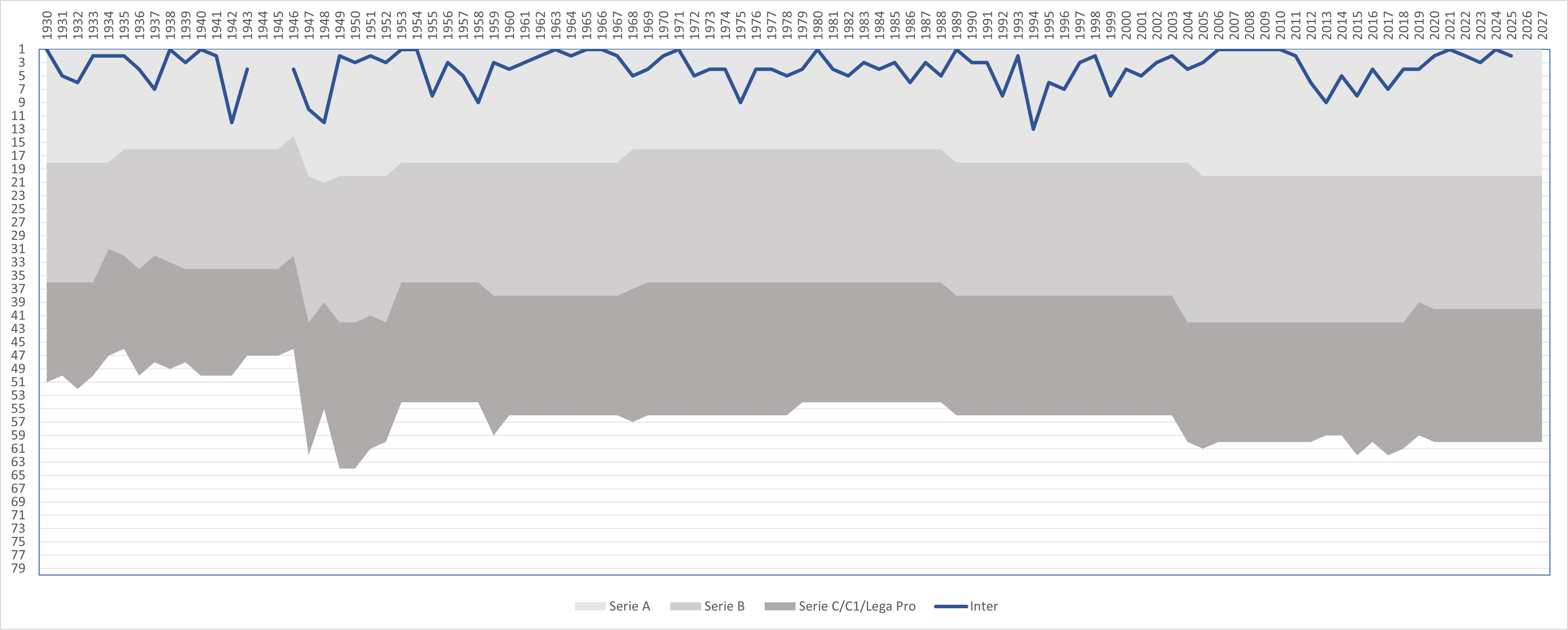
The performance of Inter in the Italian football league structure since the first season of a unified Serie A (1929/30).

In 1922, Inter were in Group B of the CCI First Division and came in last after picking up only 11 points in the season. Inter remained in the top league after winning two salvation play-offs.

In 1928, during the Fascist era, the club was forced to merge with the Unione Sportiva Milanese and was renamed Società Sportiva Ambrosiana. For the 1928–29 season, they wore white shirts with a red cross emblazoned on it: this design was inspired by the flag and coat of arms of the city of Milan, which in turn derives from the flag of the patron saint of Milan, St. Ambrose, and dates back to the fourth century. In 1929, incoming president Oreste Simonotti decided to change the club's name to Associazione Sportiva Ambrosiana and restored the original black-and-blue striped jerseys. Supporters, however, continued to call the team Inter, and in 1931 (after the reconstitution of U.S. Milanese), new president Pozzani caved in to shareholder pressure and changed the name to Associazione Sportiva Ambrosiana-Inter.

Their first Coppa Italia (Italian Cup) was won in 1938–39, led by the great legend Giuseppe Meazza, for whom the San Siro stadium is officially named, and a fifth league championship followed in 1940, despite an injury to Meazza. After the end of World War II, the club re-emerged under their original name: Internazionale. Following the war, Inter won its sixth championship in 1953 and the seventh in 1954 - both of the titles were won with Attilio Giovannini as captain.

== Grande Inter ==

1964 European Cup Final starting lineup vs. Real Madrid

1965 European Cup Final starting lineup vs. Benfica

In 1960, Helenio Herrera joined Internazionale from Barcelona, bringing with him his midfield general Luis Suárez, who won the European Footballer of the Year that same year for his role in Barça's La Liga/Fairs Cup double. He would transform Internazionale into one of the greatest teams in Europe. He modified a 5–3–2 tactic known as the Verrou (door bolt) to include larger flexibility for counterattacks. The catenaccio system was invented by an Austrian coach named Karl Rappan. Rappan's original system was implemented with four fixed defenders playing a strict man-to-man marking system, plus a playmaker in the middle of the field who would work the ball together with two midfield wings. Herrera would sometimes modify the formation by adding a fifth defender, the sweeper or libero behind the two centre backs; the sweeper would act as the free man and deal with any attackers who penetrated the two centre backs' line.

Internazionale finished third in Serie A in Herrera's first season, second the following year and first in his third season, followed by back-to-back European Cup victories in 1964 and 1965. For his team's performances, Herrera would earn the title ll Mago, (the magician). His first-squad was made up by fullbacks Tarcisio Burgnich and Giacinto Facchetti; sweeper Armando Picchi; playmaker Luis Suárez; right winger Jair; left winger Mario Corso; and Sandro Mazzola, who played the inside-right.

The 1963–64 European Cup campaign would see Internazionale defeat German club Borussia Dortmund in the semi-final and Partizan in the quarter-final. In the final, they met Real Madrid, a team that had reached seven out of the nine finals to date. Real Madrid consisted of the ageing stars of the 1950s and a few emerging players that later went on to win the European Cup in 1966. It was Sandro Mazzola, however, who stole the show by scoring two goals in a 3–1 victory. Internazionale would then go on to claim the Intercontinental Cup over Argentine club Independiente.

One year later, Inter repeated the feat by beating two-time winner Benfica in the Final held at home. Jair was the lone scorer in 1–0 win. Additionally, and for the second-straight year, Internazionale won the Intercontinental Cup over Independiente.

In 1967 Inter reached the European Cup Final for the third time. Star playmaker Luis Suárez would miss the match due to an injury and Sandro Mazzola's penalty was not enough to stop Celtic from winning the title. In 1967, the club would again change its name to Football Club Internazionale Milano.

== Subsequent achievements ==
Following the golden era of the 1960s, Inter managed to win their 11th league title in 1971 and their 12th in 1980. Inter were defeated for the second time in five years in the final of the European Cup, going down 0–2 to Johan Cruyff's Ajax in 1972. During the 1970s and 1980s, Inter also added two trophys to its Coppa Italia tally, in 1977–78 and 1981–82.

Led by the German duo of Andreas Brehme and Lothar Matthäus and the Argentine Ramón Díaz, Inter captured the 1988–89 Serie A championship. Fellow German Jürgen Klinsmann and the Italian Supercup were added the following season, though Inter failed to defend their Serie A title, finishing in third place behind champions Napoli and city rivals Milan, respectively.

== Mixed fortunes ==
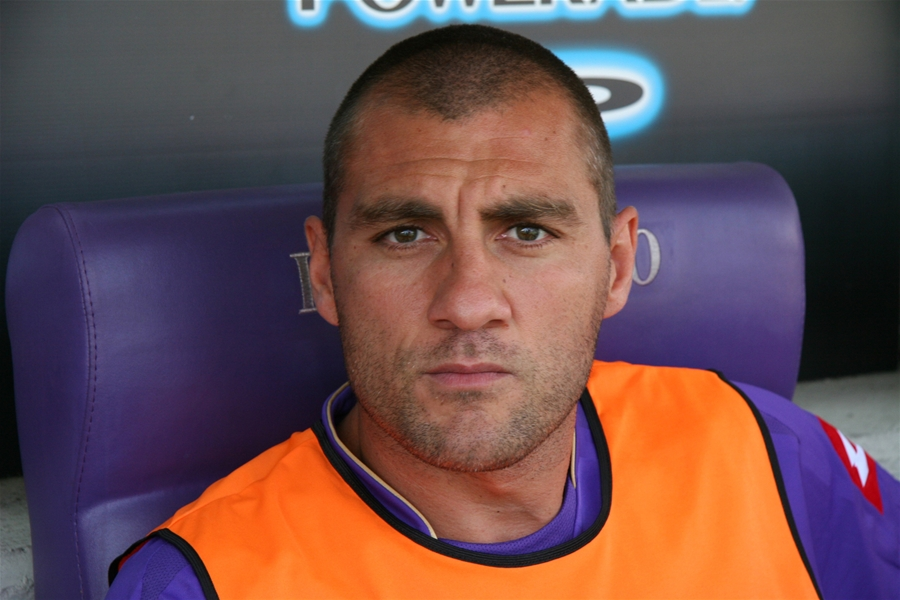
Vieri was regarded as one of the finest strikers in Europe, leading to him becoming the world's most expensive player in 1999 when Inter paid Lazio £32 million (€43 million) for his services.

The 1990s was a period of disappointment for Inter. While their great rivals, Milan and Juventus, were achieving success both domestically and in Europe, Inter were left behind with repeated mediocre results in the domestic league standings, their worst coming in 1993–94 when they finished just one position shy of the relegation zone. Nevertheless, they achieved some European success with three UEFA Cup victories in 1991, 1994 and 1998.

With Massimo Moratti's takeover from Ernesto Pellegrini in 1995, Inter were promised more success with many high-profile signings like Ronaldo and Christian Vieri, with Inter twice breaking the world record transfer fee in this period (£19.5 million for Ronaldo from Barcelona in summer 1997 and £31 million for Vieri from Lazio in the summer of 1999). The 1990s, however, remained a decade of disappointment, it being the only decade in Inter's history in which they did not win a single Serie A title.

Moratti later became a target of the fans, especially when he sacked the fan-favourite coach Luigi Simoni after only a few games into the 1998–99 season after having just received Italian manager of the year award 1998 the day before his termination. In 1998–99, Inter reached Champions Leagues Quarter-finals but failed to qualify for any European competitions for the first time in nearly ten years, finishing in a disappointing eighth place.

In the 1999–2000 season, Moratti made several major changes, once again investing in high-profile players. A major coup for Inter was the appointment of former Juventus manager Marcello Lippi. Moreover, Inter were seen by the majority of the fans and press to have finally put together a winning formula. Other signings included Italian and French legends Angelo Peruzzi and Laurent Blanc, respectively, together with other former Juventus players Christian Vieri and Vladimir Jugović. Inter were also seen to have an advantage in this season as they had no European distractions. Despite this, they failed to win the elusive Scudetto; they managed to come close to their first domestic success since 1989 when they reached the Coppa Italia final only to be defeated by Lazio, who also claimed the Scudetto.

The following season another disaster struck. Inter impressed in the SItalian SuperCup match against Lazio and took the lead through new signings Robbie Keane and Hakan Şükür, though they ultimately lost 4–3. Despite the loss, the squad was looking impressive for the start of the season. What followed, however, was another embarrassment, as they were eliminated in the preliminary round of the Champions League by Swedish club Helsingborg. Álvaro Recoba was given the opportunity to equal the tie with a last-minute penalty, but Helsingborg goalkeeper Sven Andersson made the save. Inter then found themselves back at square one, as manager Marcello Lippi was sacked just one game into the season following Inter's first-ever Serie A defeat to Reggina. Throughout this period, Inter also suffered the mocking of neighbours Milan, who were having success both domestically and in Europe and who would levy several defeats on Inter, including a 6–0 thrashing in 2000–01. Marco Tardelli, chosen to replace Lippi, failed to improve Inter's results, and is remembered by Inter fans as the manager that lost 6–0 in the Derby della Madonnina to Milan. Other Inter personnel that suffered during the club's struggles were Christian Vieri and Fabio Cannavaro, both of whom had their restaurants in Milan vandalised after defeats to the Rossoneri.

In 2002, not only did Inter manage to make it to the UEFA Cup semi-finals, they were also just 45 minutes away from capturing the Scudetto. Maintaining just a one-goal advantage over Lazio at Rome's Stadio Olimpico in the last match of the season would see-off second- and third-placed Juventus and Roma, respectively. As a result of the game's implications, some Lazio fans were actually openly supporting Inter during the match, as an Inter victory would prevent Lazio's bitter city rivals Roma from winning the championship. Inter were 1–2 up after only 24 minutes, but Lazio equalised during first-half injury time and scored two more goals in the second half to clinch the victory. Juventus ultimately won the Scudetto after their 0–2 victory away to Udinese.

The 2002–03 Serie A campaign saw Inter finish in a respectable second and also managed to make it to the 2002–03 Champions League semi-finals against rivals Milan. Being tied 1–1 with Milan, Inter lost on the away goals rule. Although they fell short in both competitions, Inter were progressing. Moratti's impatience got the better of him, as Hernán Crespo was sold after just one season and manager Héctor Cuper was fired after just a few games in charge of the team. Alberto Zaccheroni stepped in, a lifelong Inter fan but also the man who was in charge of Lazio's 4–2 victory over Inter in 2002. Zaccheroni brought nothing new to the side, apart from two fantastic wins over Juventus 1–3 in Turin and 3–2 at the San Siro, though the season was again nothing special. They were embarrassingly eliminated from the Champions League in the first round, finishing third in their group by goal differential. Furthermore, they only managed to scrape a place in next season's Champions League after finishing fourth by only a point over Parma. Inter's only saving grace in 2003–04 was the arrival of Dejan Stanković and Adriano in January 2004, making up for the departures of Clarence Seedorf and Hernán Crespo respectively.

== Resurrection and treble ==
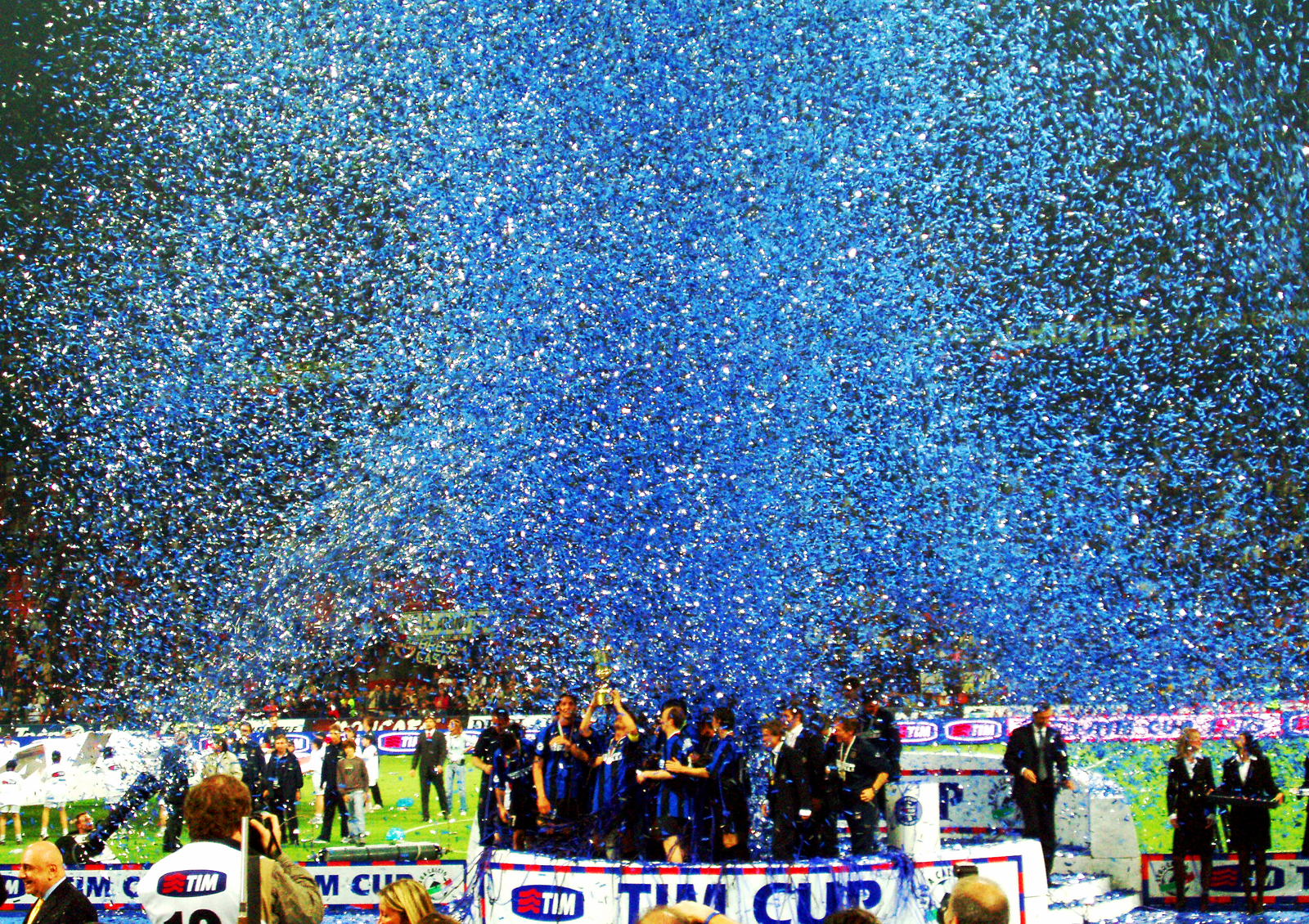
Inter won the 2004-05 Coppa Italia, beating A.S. Roma.

On 7 July 2004, Inter announced on their official website that they had appointed former Lazio boss Roberto Mancini as new head coach. In his first season, Inter and Mancini collected 72 points from 18 wins, 18 draws and only two losses. On 15 June 2005, Inter won the Coppa Italia after defeating Roma in the two-legged final 3–0 on aggregate (1–0 win in Milan and 0–2 win in Rome) and followed that up on 20 August 2005 by winning the Supercoppa Italiana after an extra-time 1–0 victory over Serie A champions Juventus. This Super Cup win was Inter's first since 1989, coincidentally the same year since Inter last won the Scudetto before 2006. On 11 May 2006, Inter retained their Coppa Italia trophy by once again defeating Roma with a 4–1 aggregate victory (a 1–1 scoreline in Rome and a 3–1 win at the San Siro).

Inter were awarded the 2005–06 Serie A championship as they were the highest-placed side in the season's final league table after points were stripped from Juventus and Milan, who were punished in the Calciopoli scandal that year. With the confirmed relegation of Juventus to Serie B and the eight-point deduction for city rivals Milan, Inter became favourites to retain their Serie A title for the 2006–07 Serie A season.

During the season, Inter went on a record-breaking run of 17 consecutive victories in Serie A, starting on 25 October 2006 with a 4–1 home victory over Livorno and ending on 28 February 2007 after a 1–1 draw at home to Udinese. The 2–5 away win at Catania on 25 February 2007 broke the original record of 15 matches held by both Bayern Munich and Real Madrid from the "Big 5" (the top flight leagues in Italy, England, Spain, France and Germany). The run lasted for almost five months and stands among the best in European league football, with just Benfica (29 wins), Celtic (25 wins) and PSV (22 wins) bettering the run. Inter's form dipped a little as they scored 0–0 and 2–2 draws against relegation-battlers Reggina and slumping Palermo, respectively, the latter game featuring a second-half comeback after Palermo went up 2–0 at half-time. They could not keep their invincibility form near the end of the season as well, as they lost their first game of the domestic season to Roma at the San Siro 1–3 thanks to two late Roma goals. Inter had enjoyed an unbeaten Serie A run for just under a year.

On 22 April 2007, Inter won their second consecutive Scudetto—and first on the field since 1989—when they defeated Siena 2–1 at Stadio Artemio Franchi. Italian World Cup-winning defender Marco Materazzi scored both goals in the 18th and 60th minute, the latter being a penalty.

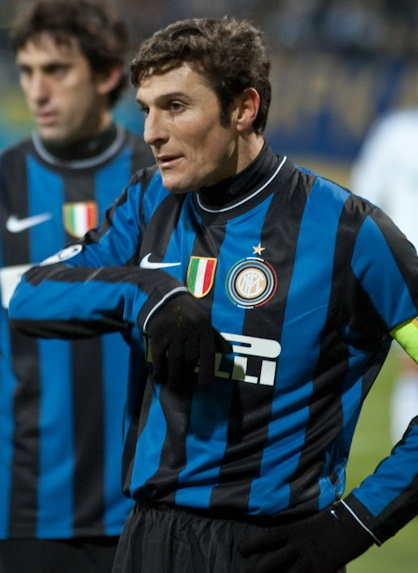
Javier Zanetti made a record 858 appearances for Inter, including 618 in Serie A.

Inter started the 2007–08 season with the goal of winning both Serie A and Champions League. The team started well in the league, topping the table from the first round of matches, and also managed to qualify for the Champions League knockout stage. A late collapse leading to a 2–0 defeat with ten men away to Liverpool on 19 February in the Champions League, however, threw into question manager Roberto Mancini's future at Inter, and domestic form took a sharp turn of fortune, with the team failing to win in the three following Serie A games (drawing with Sampdoria and major league opponents Roma, before losing away to Napoli, their first domestic defeat of the season). After being eliminated by Liverpool in the Champions League, Mancini then announced his intention to leave his job, only to change his mind the following day.

Inter had a second run of this kind between 19 and 29 March in which they again went winless through three games, against Genoa, Juventus and Lazio. Like weeks previously, on 4 May 2008, Inter once again had a chance to wrap up their Scudetto race, this time against city rivals Milan, but instead suffered a 2–1 defeat. The following week, Inter again had the chance to wrap up their Scudetto against Siena at home, complete with a festive atmosphere and an expectant crowd. Inter, however, again failed to secure the championship, losing their lead twice and ultimately settling for a 2–2 draw, with Marco Materazzi failing to convert a penalty in the dying stages of the match. The same week, Roma earned a 1–2 victory away to Atalanta, thus catapulting the Romans to within just one point of Inter going into the final round of Serie A, despite trailing their Milanese rivals by eleven points earlier on in the season.

On the final day of the 2007–08 Serie A season, Inter played Parma away while Roma travelled to Catania. This week offered an interesting juxtaposition, as both Roma and Inter looked to take the title, whereas Parma and Catania were both fighting for survival. Many scenarios could have played out, though Inter were still favourites due to their superior head-to-head record with Roma; all Inter needed to do was match Roma's result. The day started with Roma taking an early lead against Catania and for 60 minutes of the final day, Roma were top of the league; however, the lead would not hold. Inter, seemingly rejuvenated due to the introduction of Swedish striker Zlatan Ibrahimović, began to take control of the game. Amidst the pouring rain at the Stadio Ennio Tardini in Parma, Ibrahimović fired a low shot to make it 0–1 in the 62nd minute. Another Ibrahimović blast sealed the victory, and with it the hope of winning the championship faded away for Roma. Elsewhere, Catania managed to score a late equaliser that granted them the stay in Serie A for the upcoming 2009 season and left Roma three points behind Inter. Inter sealed their third championship in a row and had a late night celebration at San Siro upon their return to Milan, where they were presented with the Serie A trophy.

Following this win, however, the club opted to sack Mancini on 29 May, citing his declaration to leave following the Champions League defeat to Liverpool as the reason.

On 2 June 2008, Inter announced on their official website that they had appointed former Porto and Chelsea boss José Mourinho as new head coach, with Giuseppe Baresi as his assistant. This made Mourinho the only foreign coach in Italy in the 2008–09 season kick-off. Mourinho made only three additions to the squad during the summer transfer window of 2008 in the form of Mancini, Sulley Muntari, and Ricardo Quaresma. In Mourinho's first season as Inter head coach, the Nerazzurri won an Italian Super Cup and a fourth consecutive title, being, however, also eliminated from the Champions League in the first knockout round for a third consecutive time, losing to Manchester United. In winning the league title for the fourth consecutive time, Inter joined Torino and Juventus as the only teams to do this and the first to accomplish this feat in the last 60 years.

2010 Champions League Final starting lineup vs. Bayern Munich

Inter enjoyed more luck in the 2009–10 Champions League, managing to progress to the quarter-finals by eliminating Mourinho's former team, Chelsea, in a 3–1 aggregate win; this was the first time in three years that the Nerazzurri had passed the first knockout round. Inter then progressed to the semi-finals of the tournament by beating CSKA Moscow 2–0 on aggregate, winning both legs. Inter managed to achieve a 3–1 win over incumbent champions Barcelona in the first leg of the semi-final. In the second leg, a resolute Inter lost 1–0 but progressed 3–2 on aggregate to their fifth European Cup/Champions League Final, with Bayern Munich as opponents. They won the match 2–0 with two goals from Diego Milito, and were crowned champions of Europe. Inter also won the 2009–10 Serie A title by two points over Roma, and the 2010 Coppa Italia by defeating the same side 1–0 in the final.

By winning the Scudetto, Coppa Italia and Champions League in a single season, Inter completed The Treble, becoming the first-ever Italian team to achieve the feat. However, their attempt to defend these honours are without Mourinho, as he agreed a deal to take charge of Spanish club Real Madrid on 28 May 2010. Inter appointed Rafael Benítez as new coach after signing a two-year contract in June 2010.

On 21 August 2010, Inter defeated Roma 3–1 and won the 2010 Supercoppa Italiana, the fourth trophy of the year. In December 2010, they claimed the FIFA Club World Cup for the first time after a 3–0 win against TP Mazembe in the final. Internazionale completed the Quintuple, becoming the fourth team in the world to do so after only Liverpool in 2001, Egyptians Al-Ahly in 2006 and Barcelona in 2009. After this win, however, on 23 December 2010, due to his poor performance in Serie A and separated by 13 points from the leaders Milan (although Inter played two games less due to the FIFA Club World Cup appointment), the team announced Benítez's departure on their website. He was replaced by Leonardo the following day.

Leonardo started extremely well, collecting 30 points from twelve games, with an average of 2.5 points per game, better than his predecessors Benítez and Mourinho. On 6 March 2011, Leonardo set a new Italian Serie A record by collecting 33 points in 13 games; the previous record was 32 points in 13 games made by Fabio Capello in 2004–05. On 15 March 2011, Inter had a memorable 3–2 Champions League away victory over Bayern Munich at the Allianz Arena in the round of 16 after losing the first leg at home, but lost in the quarter-finals against Schalke 04. After Inter lost against Milan, and two weeks later Parma, Inter's Serie A season title ambitions had effectively ended. The only trophy the club won with Leonardo as a manager was the Coppa Italia. On 18 June 2011, Leonardo resigned and was followed by not so successful new managers Gian Piero Gasperini, Claudio Ranieri and Andrea Stramaccioni. The club in the 2011–12 season finished as sixth, a quarter-finalist in Coppa Italia, lost in the Supercoppa Italiana, and Champions League knockout phase.

== Changes in ownership ==
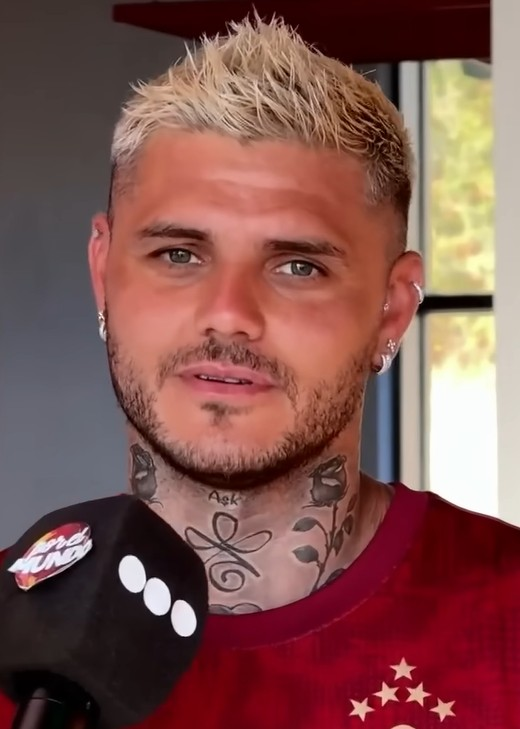
Mauro Icardi captained Inter from 2015 to 2019.

On 1 August 2012, the club announced that Moratti to sell a minority interests of the club to a Chinese consortium led by Kenneth Huang. On the same day, Inter announced an agreement was formed with China Railway Construction Corporation Limited for a new stadium project, however, the deal with the Chinese eventually collapsed. In the 2012–13 season, they finished ninth, as semi-finalist in Coppa Italia and lost in the Europa League knockout phase.

On 15 October 2013, Indonesians Erick Thohir, Rosan Roeslani and Handy Soetedjo signed an agreement to acquire 70 percent of Inter shares with an acquisition value of $501 million. During Thohir era the club began to modify its financial structure from one reliant on continual owner investment to a more self sustain business model although the club still breached UEFA Financial Fair Play Regulations in 2015. The club was fined and received squad reduction in UEFA competitions, with additional penalties suspended in the probation period. During this time, Roberto Mancini returned as coach on 14 November 2014.

On 6 June 2016, Suning Holdings Group (via a Luxembourg-based subsidiary Great Horizon S.á r.l.) a company owned by Zhang Jindong, co-founder and chairman of Suning Commerce Group, acquired a majority stake of Inter Milan from Thohir's consortium International Sports Capital S.p.A. and from Moratti family's remaining shares in Internazionale Holding S.r.l. According to various filings, the total investment from Suning was around €270 million.

The first season of new ownership, however, started with poor performance in pre-season friendlies. On 8 August 2016, Inter parted company with head coach Roberto Mancini by mutual consent over disagreements regarding the club's direction. He was replaced by Frank de Boer who was sacked on 1 November 2016 after leading Inter to a 4W–2D–5L record in 11 Serie A games as head coach. The successor, Stefano Pioli, didn't save the team from getting the worst group result in UEFA competitions in the club's history. Despite an eight-game winning streak, he and the club parted away before season's end when it became clear they would finish outside the league's top three for the sixth consecutive season. On 9 June 2017, former Roma coach Luciano Spalletti was appointed as Inter manager, signing a two-year contract, and eleven months later Inter clinched a UEFA Champions League group stage spot after going six years without Champions League participation thanks to a 3–2 victory against Lazio in the final game of 2017–18 Serie A. Due to this success, in August the club extended the contract with Spalletti to 2021.

On 26 October 2018, Steven Zhang was appointed as new president of the club. On 25 January 2019, the club officially announced that LionRock Capital from Hong Kong reached an agreement with International Sports Capital HK Limited, in order to acquire its 31.05% shares in Inter and to become the club's new minority shareholder. After the 2018–19 Serie A season, despite Inter finishing fourth, Spalletti was sacked. In May 2021, American investment firm Oaktree Capital loaned Inter $336 million to cover losses incurred during the COVID-19 pandemic.

== Renewed successes ==

2023 Champions League Final starting lineup vs. Manchester City

On 31 May 2019, Inter appointed former Juventus and Italian manager Antonio Conte as their new coach, signing a three-year deal. In September 2019, Steven Zhang was elected to the board of the European Club Association. In the 2019–20 Serie A, Inter Milan finished as runner-up as they won 2–0 against Atalanta on the last matchday. They also reached the 2020 UEFA Europa League Final, ultimately losing 3–2 to Sevilla. Following Atalanta's draw against Sassuolo on 2 May 2021, Internazionale were confirmed as champions for the first time in eleven years, ending Juventus' run of nine consecutive titles. However, despite securing Serie A glory, Conte left the club by mutual consent on 26 May 2021. The departure was reportedly due to disagreements between Conte and the board over player transfers. In June 2021, Simone Inzaghi was appointed as Conte's replacement. On 8 August 2021, Romelu Lukaku was sold to Chelsea for €115 million, representing the most expensive association football transfer by an Italian football club ever.

On 12 January 2022, Inter won the Supercoppa Italiana, defeating Juventus 2–1 at San Siro. After conceding a goal to the opponent, Inter equalised with a penalty scored by Lautaro Martínez, and the match finished 1–1 in regulation time. In the last second of the extra-time, Alexis Sánchez scored the winning goal following a defensive error, giving Inter the first trophy of the season, also Simone Inzaghi's first trophy as Inter manager. On 11 May 2022, Inter won the Coppa Italia defeating Juventus 4–2 at Stadio Olimpico. After normal time had ended 2–2, with Nicolò Barella and Hakan Çalhanoğlu scoring Inter's goals, Ivan Perišić's brace in the extra-time gave Inter the win and the second title of the season. The 2021–22 Serie A campaign saw Inter finish in second place, being the most prolific attacking side with 84 goals. On 18 January 2023, Inter won the Supercoppa Italiana, defeating Milan 3−0 at King Fahd International Stadium, thanks to goals from Federico Dimarco, Edin Džeko, and Lautaro Martinez.

On 16 May 2023, Inter won against Milan in the semi-finals of 2022–23 UEFA Champions League and qualified for the final, the first time they have reached the final in the UEFA Champions League since 2010. However, they were defeated at the Atatürk Olympic Stadium 1−0 by Manchester City after a second half goal from Rodri.

In January 2024 Inter won its eight Supercoppa Italiana and its third consecutive, in a new format with 4 teams, tying the record set by AC Milan in 90's for consecutive win, after have defeated in Riad Lazio 3-0 and then in the final match Napoli 1–0, with a late goal by Lautaro Martinez.

In July 2023 Inter sold for 50 million € goalkeeper Andre Onana to Manchester United, acquired the prior season for free, like Hakan Calhanoglu in 2021, Henrikh Mkhitaryan in 2022 and Marcus Thuram in 2023.

On 22 April 2024, Inter secured their 20th Serie A title and the second Star by defeating Milan 2–1 at the San Siro in a record sixth consecutive Derby della Madonnina win in a dominant season ended with 94 points, 19 over Milan second, the best attack with 89 goals made and the best defense with only 22 goals conceded with +67 difference, the best in Serie A since 1950–1951 season.

On 22 May 2024, Oaktree Capital Management assumed ownership of Inter Milan following the default of Suning Holdings Group on a substantial loan given in May 2021 to the club in order to cover losses incurred during the COVID-19 pandemic. The firm took control of the club after Suning Holdings Group failed to repay a debt of €395 million ($428 million). This development was confirmed by Oaktree in an emailed statement. As a consequence, the new ownership chose to appoint CEO Giuseppe Marotta as the club's new chairman.
