= PPTV =

Chinese streaming website

Shanghai SynaCast Media Tech d/b/a PPTV
- Website type: Video streaming and hosting
- Available in: Chinese language and dialects
- Owner: Suning Holdings Group
- Website: www.pptv.com
- Commercial: yes
- Registration: optional
- Written in: simplified Chinese characters

PPTV
- Simplified Chinese: PP视频
- Hanyu Pinyin: P P Shìpín
- Literal meaning: PP Video
Transcriptions
Standard Mandarin
- Hanyu Pinyin: P P Shìpín

former name
- Simplified Chinese: 聚力视频
- Hanyu Pinyin: Jùlì Shìpín
Transcriptions
Standard Mandarin
- Hanyu Pinyin: Jùlì Shìpín

Shanghai SynaCast Media Tech Co., Ltd.
- Simplified Chinese: 上海聚力传媒技术有限公司
- Hanyu Pinyin: Shànghǎi Jùlì Chuánméi Jìshù Yǒuxiàn Gōngsī
Transcriptions
Standard Mandarin
- Hanyu Pinyin: Shànghǎi Jùlì Chuánméi Jìshù Yǒuxiàn Gōngsī

PPTV (Chinese: PP视频) is a Chinese video streaming website. Its predecessor, PPLive, was peer-to-peer streaming video freeware created at the Huazhong University of Science and Technology in Wuhan, Hubei Province. The group of companies that runs the website was headed by Cayman Islands-incorporated offshore company PPLive Corporation. However, the actual operations were mainly carried out by Shanghai SynaCast Media Tech Co., Ltd. (Chinese: 上海聚力传媒技术有限公司).

== History ==
A 68.08% stake of the parent company of PPTV, PPLive Corporation, was acquired by Shenzhen-based Chinese blue chip listed company Suning Commerce Group (now known as Suning.com) in 2013–14. However, the stake was re-sold to Suning.com's largest shareholder, Zhang Jindong's Suning Holdings Group in 2015, for CN¥2.5879931 billion.

== TV rights ==
PPTV owns the following football broadcasting rights in China:

- International Champions Cup
- UEFA
  - UEFA National Team Home Friendlies (2018–2022)
  - UEFA Champions League (2018–2022)
  - UEFA Europa League (2018–2022)
  - UEFA Super Cup (2018–2021)
  - UEFA Youth League (2018–2021)
  - UEFA Women's Champions League (2018–2021)
- Copa América (2020)
- Chinese Super League (2018–2025) (terminated before 2021 season commenced)
- K League
- J League
- DFL (2018–2023) (terminated after 2020–21 season)
  - Bundesliga
  - DFL-Supercup
  - DFB-Pokal
- La Liga (2015–2020) (terminated after 2018–19 season)
- Copa del Rey
- Supercopa de España
- Premier League (2019–2022) (terminated early in August 2020)
- FA Cup (2018–2024) (terminated in February 2021)
- FA Community Shield (2018–2020)
- Serie A (2018–2021) (terminated in February 2021)
- Ligue 1 (2018–2021)
- Brasileirão (2021)
- Primera Division de Argentina

https://www.cbf.com.br/a-cbf/informes/index/brasileirao-assai-sera-transmitido-na-china-pela-pp-sports-lider-em-d
