= Sunning =

Sunning may refer to:

- Sunning, Berkshire, United Kingdom
- The former name (新寧) of Taishan, Guangdong, China
- Sunning (behaviour)

== See also ==
- Suning (disambiguation)
- Sunning Plaza and Sunning Court, former building complex in Hong Kong
