= Suning Real Estate =

Chinese real estate company

Suning Real Estate Co., Ltd.
- Native name: 苏宁置业集团有限公司
- Company type: Limited company
- Industry: Real Estate
- Founded: 2002
- Founder: Zhang Jindong
- Headquarters: 16th floor, 68 Huaihai Road, Nanjing, China
- Key people: Zhang Jindong (chairman); Lou Xiaojun (vice chairman)
- Net income: CN¥4.742 million (Q1–3 2015)
- Total assets: CN¥54.639 billion (Q1–3 2015)
- Total equity: CN¥7.985 billion (Q1–3 2015)
- Owner: Zhang Jindong (65%); Suning Appliance Group (25%); Zhang Kangyang (10%)
- Website: suningestate.com
- Footnotes / references in consolidated balance sheets (unaudited)

Suning Real Estate Co., Ltd. (Chinese: 苏宁置业集团有限公司) is a Chinese real estate company. It was privately held by the founder of Suning.com, Zhang Jindong, for 65% stake.

Suning Plaza, Zhenjiang and Nanjing Olympic Suning Tower were under construction by the company. Suning Plaza, Wuxi was completed in 2014. Some properties of Suning Real Estate were leased back to Suning Commerce Group.

In 2010 Hyatt signed an agreement with Suning Real Estate, for management of three hotels: Park Hyatt Nanjing (in Suning Plaza, Nanjing, originally Grand Hyatt Nanjing), Hyatt Regency Wuxi (in Suning Plaza, Wuxi) and Hyatt Regency Xuzhou (in Suning Plaza, Xuzhou). In 2011, Hyatt Regency Zhenjiang in Suning Plaza, Zhenjiang was added. It was announced that Grand Hyatt Nanjing would be opened in Suning Ruicheng (Chinese: 苏宁睿城).

Suning Real Estate also signed an agreement with French hotel group Sofitel for several hotels, such as Sofitel Nanjing Galaxy Suning, Sofitel Nanjing Zhongshan Golf Suning and Sofitel Lianyungang Suning.
