= Suning Plaza =

Suning Plaza (Chinese: 苏宁广场) may refer to:

- Suning Plaza, Zhenjiang
- Suning Plaza, Wuxi

== See also ==
- Suning (disambiguation)
- Sunning Plaza
