= Liu Xiaomeng =

Chinese billionaire

- Born: 1954 or 1955 (age 70–71)
- Known for: ex-owner of Suning Appliance Group

Liu Xiaomeng (Chinese: 刘晓萌, born 1954/1955) is a Chinese billionaire from Nanjing, who co-founded Suning Appliance in 1990.

In 2014 - at age 59 - The Daily Telegraph declared that Xiaomeng was one of the world's five self-made women billionaires.

Liu Xiaomeng lives in Nanjing, China.
