= Xiaoyi =

Xiaoyi 孝义市
- County-level city
- Location in Shanxi
- Coordinates: 36°5′N 111°31′E
- Country: People's Republic of China
- Province: Shanxi
- Prefecture-level city: Lüliang

Area
  - County-level city: 946.0 km^{2} (365.3 sq mi)
  - Urban: 54.50 km^{2} (21.04 sq mi)

Population (2017)
  - County-level city: 492,000
  - Density: 520/km^{2} (1,350/sq mi)
  - Urban: 293,600
- Time zone: UTC+8 (China Standard)

Xiaoyi (Chinese: 孝义) is a county-level city under the administration of Lüliang prefecture-level city, in Shanxi Province, China.

Xiaoyi was built by the State of Jin in 594 BC, named Guayang in Spring and Autumn period. It was renamed Zhongyang in Three Kingdoms period and Yong'an in Northern Wei period. In 627 AD (Tang dynasty), it was renamed Xiaoyi by Emperor Taizong of Tang.

Xiaoyi is known for its abundant mineral resources, including coal, iron ore and bauxite. It is also known for walnuts and shadow play.

== Climate ==
Climate data for Xiaoyi, elevation 773 m (2,536 ft), (1991–2020 normals, extremes 1981–2010)
Month	Jan	Feb	Mar	Apr	May	Jun	Jul	Aug	Sep	Oct	Nov	Dec	Year
Record high °C (°F)	14.5 (58.1)	21.7 (71.1)	29.6 (85.3)	37.0 (98.6)	39.0 (102.2)	41.1 (106.0)	39.3 (102.7)	37.4 (99.3)	37.4 (99.3)	30.0 (86.0)	24.3 (75.7)	17.8 (64.0)	41.1 (106.0)
Mean daily maximum °C (°F)	2.6 (36.7)	7.1 (44.8)	13.9 (57.0)	21.1 (70.0)	26.6 (79.9)	30.3 (86.5)	31.0 (87.8)	28.8 (83.8)	24.3 (75.7)	18.4 (65.1)	10.6 (51.1)	3.9 (39.0)	18.2 (64.8)
Daily mean °C (°F)	−4.0 (24.8)	−0.1 (31.8)	6.5 (43.7)	13.5 (56.3)	19.2 (66.6)	23.2 (73.8)	24.8 (76.6)	22.8 (73.0)	17.6 (63.7)	11.3 (52.3)	3.9 (39.0)	−2.2 (28.0)	11.4 (52.5)
Mean daily minimum °C (°F)	−9.4 (15.1)	−5.6 (21.9)	0.2 (32.4)	6.3 (43.3)	11.7 (53.1)	16.2 (61.2)	19.4 (66.9)	17.7 (63.9)	12.3 (54.1)	5.8 (42.4)	−1.2 (29.8)	−7.0 (19.4)	5.5 (42.0)
Record low °C (°F)	−23.1 (−9.6)	−22.8 (−9.0)	−12.2 (10.0)	−5.3 (22.5)	−0.4 (31.3)	5.9 (42.6)	11.7 (53.1)	9.7 (49.5)	1.1 (34.0)	−7.3 (18.9)	−18.9 (−2.0)	−21.6 (−6.9)	−23.1 (−9.6)
Average precipitation mm (inches)	3.9 (0.15)	5.9 (0.23)	10.5 (0.41)	27.8 (1.09)	28.4 (1.12)	43.3 (1.70)	101.6 (4.00)	100.4 (3.95)	67.2 (2.65)	36.2 (1.43)	13.7 (0.54)	3.1 (0.12)	442 (17.39)
Average precipitation days (≥ 0.1 mm)	2.0	2.7	3.5	5.4	6.0	9.2	11.1	10.4	8.4	6.2	3.5	1.5	69.9
Average snowy days	2.7	3.2	2.0	0.3	0	0	0	0	0	0	1.5	2.0	11.7
Average relative humidity (%)	48	46	43	45	47	54	66	72	71	63	56	49	55
Mean monthly sunshine hours	170.3	177.3	217.7	243.5	270.6	244.7	228.4	210.1	190.0	196.4	178.0	168.2	2,495.2
Percentage possible sunshine	55	58	58	61	62	56	51	50	52	57	59	57	56
Source: China Meteorological Administration

== Notable people ==
- Liang Bin, former vice governor of Shanxi province
- Su Ning (1953–1991), military officer
