= Suning Holdings Group =

Chinese company

Suning Holdings Group Co., Ltd.
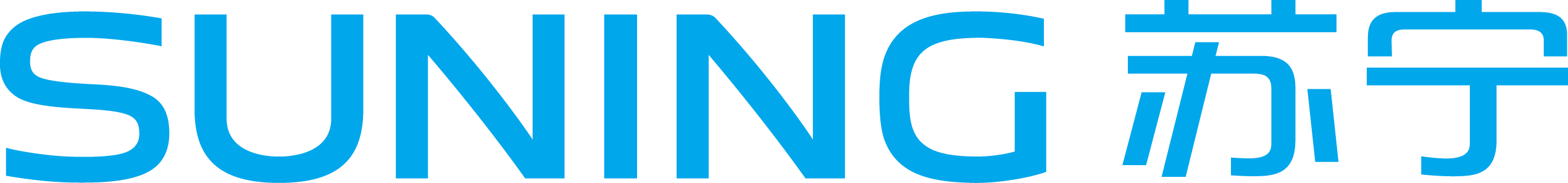

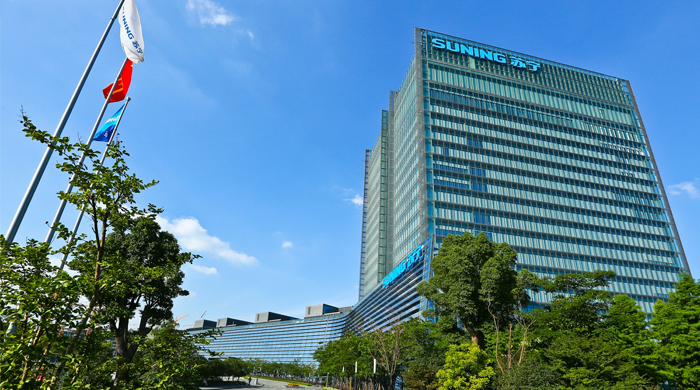
- Headquarters at Nanjing, Jiangsu
- Company type: Privately held limited company
- Industry: Holding company
- Predecessor: Divisions of Suning Appliance
- Founded: 1990 (predecessor of Suning Appliance); 14 June 2011 (date of incorporation)
- Founder: Zhang Jindong
- Headquarters: Nanjing, China
- Key people: Zhang Jindong (chairman)
- Revenue: CN¥665.259 billion (US$104.446 billion, 2020)
- Owner: Zhang Jindong (100%)
- Number of employees: 300,000 (approx) (2019)
Subsidiaries
Suning Rundong	(80%)
Suning Culture Investment	(90%)
→ PPTV	(68.08%)
Suning Jinkong	(80%)
Suning Sports	(90%)

Chinese name
- Simplified Chinese: 苏宁控股集团有限公司
- Traditional Chinese: 蘇寕控股集團有限公司
- Hanyu Pinyin: Sūníng Kònggǔ Jítuán Yǒuxiàn Gōngsī
- Literal meaning: Suning Holdings Group Limited Company
Transcriptions
Standard Mandarin
- Hanyu Pinyin: Sūníng Kònggǔ Jítuán Yǒuxiàn Gōngsī

short name
- Simplified Chinese: 苏宁控股
- Traditional Chinese: 蘇寕控股
- Hanyu Pinyin: Sūníng Kònggǔ
- Literal meaning: Suning Holdings
Transcriptions
Standard Mandarin
- Hanyu Pinyin: Sūníng Kònggǔ
- Website: suningholdings.com
- Footnotes / references in separate balance sheets (unaudited)

Suning Holdings Group Co., Ltd. (Chinese: 苏宁控股集团有限公司) is a Chinese privately held company. The company shared the same founder Zhang Jindong with the listed company Suning.com, but Suning Holdings was the unlisted portion of Zhang's unincorporated Suning Group. According to All-China Federation of Industry and Commerce, Suning Holdings Group was ranked as the second largest civilian-run enterprise in the mainland China in 2018.

The holding company is notable outside of China for its acquisition of Inter Milan in 2016.

Suning Holdings, as of 2016, owned an equity stake of 3.33% in Suning.com, formerly known as Suning Commerce Group (Chinese: 苏宁云商集团) and Suning Appliance (Chinese: 苏宁电器股份).

Those companies also shared almost the same name with sister company Suning Appliance Group (Chinese: 苏宁电器集团), which Zhang owned 48.10% stake as the second largest shareholder. As of 31 December 2016 Suning Appliance Group was the second largest shareholder of Suning.com, after Zhang. Suning Appliance Group was owned by ex-senior staff of Suning.com (including Zhang himself) as at 2002. Since circa 2015 to 10 April 2017, it was owned by Bu Yang (49.1%), Zhang (48.1%) and Sun Weimin (2.8%), the three senior official of Suning.com.

In 2020 ranked second in the top 500 non-state owned enterprises in China with annual revenues of RMB 665.259 billion and continued to top the list of Internet retailing category.

In March 2021, a 23% stake of Suning.com was sold to state-owned investors to improve equity structure and long-term strategy due to financial problems.

== Operations ==
In June 2016, Suning Holdings signed a framework agreement with the government of Shandong Province.

== Subsidiaries ==
=== Suning Rundong ===
Suning Holdings, via a subsidiary, Suning Rundong (Chinese: 苏宁润东股权投资管理有限公司; pinyin: Sūníng rùndōng gǔquán tóuzī guǎnlǐ yǒuxiàn gōngsī), subscribed the capital increase of Nubia Technology, a subsidiary of Chinese tech company ZTE for CN¥1.930 billion in December 2015. After the deal Suning Rundong owned 33.33% stake in Nubia. Nubia Technology sold mobile phone branded "Nubia". In 2016, Nubia became a sponsor of Jiangsu Suning, a sister company of Suning Rundong for a reported CN¥150 million. In April 2016, Suning Rundong sold a 4.90% stake in Nubia to Suning Commerce Group (Suning.com) for CN¥283.7 million, proportional to the original subscribe price.

As of 2015, Suning Holdings owned 70% stake in Suning Rundong, Suning.com owned 10% and Chen Yan (Chinese: 陈艳) owned 20% stake. The stake that held by Suning Holdings, was increased to 80% in 2016, acquiring an additional 10% from Suning.com.

According to China Daily, Suning Rundong was an investment fund with a size of RMB5 billion.

=== Suning Culture Investment Management ===
Suning Culture Investment Management Co., Ltd. (Chinese: 苏宁文化投资管理有限公司) was another investment vehicle of the group. As of 2015, it was 90% owned by Suning Holdings Group and 10% owned by Chen Yan.

Suning Culture Investment Management invested CN¥19.6 million for 10% stake in China International Broadcasting Network (CIBN; incorporated as Chinese: 国广东方网络（北京）有限公司; lit. 'Global Broadcasting – Oriental Network (Beijing) Co', '. Ltd.'), an internet television channel.

On 31 October 2015, Suning Culture Investment acquired 68.08% stake in a video hosting and streaming website: PPTV (the parent company was incorporated as PPLive Corporation, the local unit was incorporated as Shanghai SynaCast Media Tech) from Caymans-incorporated Great Universe Limited, an indirect wholly owned subsidiary of sister company Suning.com for CN¥2.5879931 billion. PPTV secured the exclusive China TV rights of La Liga for 5 seasons in mid-2015.

=== Suning Jinkong ===
Suning Jinkong (Chinese: 苏宁金控投资有限公司; lit. 'Suning Financial Holding and Investment Co.', 'Ltd.') is an investment vehicle of the group in financial sector.

As of 31 December 2016, it was 80% owned by Suning Holdings and 20% owned by Chen Yan. Moreover, all the paid-in share capital was contributed by Suning Holdings.

Suning Jinkong purchased 35% stake of Suning Jinfu (Chinese: 苏宁金融服务（上海）有限公司; lit. 'Suning Financial Services (Shanghai) Co', '. Ltd.'), for CN¥5.834 billion in April 2016. That company was a subsidiary of Suning.com. The 35% stake was later transferred to a private equity fund Nanjing Runyu (Chinese: 南京润煜企业管理咨询中心（有限合伙）), which Suning.com claimed that, the fund was still controlled by Suning Holdings. According to National Credit Information Publicity System, however, CITIC Trust was a unit holder of the private equity fund; Suning Rundong was the general partner of the fund, which the fund incorporated as a limited partnership.

=== Suning Sports ===
Jiangsu Suning Sports (Chinese: 江苏苏宁体育产业有限公司), is a joint venture of Suning Holdings and Suning Appliance Group. Suning Sports had a share capital of CN¥1 billion. As of 31 December 2016, Suning Holdings owned 90% stake.

Suning Sports became an angel investor of Champdas (incorporated as Chinese: 上海创冰信息科技有限公司; lit. 'Shanghai Chuangbing Information Technology Co.', 'Ltd.'), a company specialize in sports statistics in 2016. Suning Sports also appointed football coach and former player Gong Lei as their sports director.

Jiangsu Suning Sports had a sister company Suning Sports International Limited, a company incorporated in Hong Kong, which was the subsidiary of Suning Culture Investment Management instead, at the date of incorporation on 26 May 2016. However, it was known that Jiangsu Suning Sports had acquired Suning Sports International on 30 May 2016.

On February 28, 2021, Suning Group immediately halted operations at their Chinese football clubs - including champions Jiangsu - due to financial woes.

=== Inter Milan ===
On 6 June 2016 Suning Holdings, via Great Horizon S.à r.l., signed a contract to acquire a majority stake (about 70% shares) in Inter Milan by the subscription of a capital increase and from the consortium of Erick Thohir (International Sports Capital) and the consortium of Massimo Moratti (Internazionale Holding). The deal was approved by the extraordinary general meeting on 28 June, which after the deal, Suning Holdings owned 68.55% shares.

According to website Calcio e Finanza (which purchased filings in Hong Kong Companies Registry and Luxembourg Business Registers) and Il Sole 24 Ore columnist Carlo Festa, Great Horizon direct parent company was Suning Sports International Limited, in turn a subsidiary of Suning Culture International Limited (as of the date of incorporation of Suning Sports International on 26 May 2016), in turn a subsidiary of Suning Culture Investment Management.

According Suning Sports International's 2017 Annual Return submission to the Hong Kong Companies Registry, Jiangsu Suning Sports had acquired the entire share capital of Suning Sports International from sister company Suning Culture International on 30 May 2016, few weeks before the takeover of Inter Milan. However, Chen Yan remained as the sole director of Suning Sports International.

Structure of F.C. Internazionale Milano Group, as of 2017, based on legal filings

Zhang Jindong	Zhang and other shareholders
Suning Holdings Group Co., Ltd.	Suning Appliance Group Co., Ltd.
Jiangsu Suning Sports Co., Ltd.
Suning Sports International Ltd.
International Sports Capital S.p.A. (see Erick Thohir)	Great Horizon S.á r.l.	others (Pirelli, other descendants of Angelo Moratti etc.)
F.C. Internazionale Milano S.p.A.

In February 2021, according to the Financial Times, Inter Milan is working with Goldman Sachs and rushing to raise at least $200m in emergency cash or sell the club, after the Italian football club's finances deteriorated due to the pandemic and heavy spending on top players.

On May 2, 2021, four days before the end of the Serie A championship, he won the nineteenth championship in the history of the club, eleven years after the triumph of the season 009-2010. The Suning Group, in the fifth year of management of the company, after the second place in domestic league of the season 2019-2020 and the defeat in the final of UEFA Europa League, is the first foreign property to win the Scudetto in Italy and the first Chinese to win in Europe. In mid-May 2021, Inter signed a 275 million euro ($336 million) deal with US based Oaktree Capital Management in the hope the deal will help the team's troubled finances that were damaged by the COVID-19 pandemic. The fund granted the loan to Great Horizon Sarl – the Luxembourg-based holdings company via which Suning controls Inter.

In the first five years of Suning's management, the company value touched + 120% (second best performance in Europe); more than 500 million euros was spent on the market, 500 million fans are reached in worldwide and the highest growth in all of Europe of followers on social media (+ 232%) and new infrastructure was also created, such as the club house in the sports center, the Inter media house, the center for the youth sector and the new headquarters in Viale della Liberazione, Milan.

On 22 May 2024, Suning relinquished control of its controlling stake in Inter Milan after it failed to repay the €395 million it owed Oaktree Capital Management, with the €275 million loan taken out in 2021 being collateralized by its shares in the club.

== Charity ==
Suning's public welfare philosophy is "Rooting Society and Growing Business". The Suning Social Worker Voluntary Action "1 + 1 Sunshine Walk" invites Suning employees to take voluntary social responsibility. At least one day per year is used for social volunteer work and at least one salary day is donated each year for public assistance donations. In addition to donating to charity, Suning also initiated the "Suning Nesting Action" to build school buildings in poor areas; the "Suning Xiqiao Project" to help repair repairs in remote areas to solve travel difficulties and finance the "Suning Sunny Dream" rural education. Additionally, Suning Appliance annually sponsors tree planting activities in various regions of China.

On December 26, 2013, following the tradition of celebrating public welfare, Suning made charitable donations, including the donation of 36,95 millions yuan. In August 2016, Suning, which recently became the majority shareholder of Inter, donated € 200,000 to help the people affected by the earthquake in Central Italy.

In January 2020, with the spread of COVID-19 pandemic, Suning Holdings Group mobilized through the divisions of "Suning International" and "Suning Logistics", supported relief efforts from the start of the emergency, with free shipping services and product donations imported from abroad to local hospitals and institutions. President Zhang Kangyang, the Inter club and Suning have donated 300,000 Personal protective equipment and Surgical mask to Wuhan and to the Hubei hospital, to support the fight against the COVID-19 pandemic.

On February 25, 2021, Suning Group received the "China Charity Awards" for the sixth time, the highest recognition in this field, for continuing its efforts in the fight against poverty. Suning has donated more than RMB 2,3 billions for targeted poverty reduction and rural revitalization, with RMB 850 millions earmarked for special initiatives. Suning has donated funds and equipment to 388 impoverished counties in over 20 provinces, including Yunnan, Sichuan, Guizhou, Xinjiang and Shaanxi. The company has built 170 Suning bridges, 160 Suning Dream Center, 74 Suning school buildings, helping to solve the issues of basic education and housing for more than 100,000 school-age children in the country's rural areas, 20 roads and countless other public interest projects. In addition, its football charity program covers over 300 schools, while the Dream Caravan-Suning project to bring education to students across the country has already reached 60 schools, starting dozens of educational courses. It has opened over 7,000 E-commerce stores and created channels to help farmers sell their products on digital pavilions. Total sales exceeded RMB 14 billions, destined for over 10,000 poverty-stricken villages and helping over 500,000 families. The company also launched 116 poverty reduction training centers in 111 hard-hit counties, employing more than 6,000 people.

== Financial data ==
Financial data in CNY billions
Year	2010	2011	2012	2013	2014	2015	2016	2017	2018	2019	2020
Revenue	117.60	156.20	194.70	232.72	279.81	282.90	350.29	412.95	557.88	602.46	665.26

== Sister companies ==
- Suning Real Estate, Zhang owned 65% stake
- Suning Appliance Group, Zhang owned 48.1% stake as the second largest shareholder
- Suning.com, Zhang owned 17.62% stake directly

== See also ==
- List of largest private non-governmental companies by revenue
