= Jiangsu F.C. =

Chinese association football club

Jiangsu Sainty
- Full name: Jiangsu Football Club 江苏足球俱乐部
- Nickname: The Sainties
- Founded: 1958; 68 years ago (semi-professional); 28 March 1994 (professional)
- Dissolved: 28 February 2021
- Ground: Nanjing Olympic Sports Centre, Nanjing, Jiangsu, China PR
- Capacity: 61,443
- 2020: Super League, 1st of 16 (champions)
Home colours	Away colours

Jiangsu F.C.
- Traditional Chinese: 江蘇足球俱樂部
- Simplified Chinese: 江苏足球俱乐部
- Literal meaning: Jiangsu Football Club
Transcriptions
Standard Mandarin
- Hanyu Pinyin: Jiāngsū Zúqiú Jùlèbù

Jiangsu Football Club (Chinese: 江苏足球俱乐部) was a Chinese professional football club based in Nanjing, Jiangsu, most known for their spell in the Chinese Super League from 2009 to 2020. Their home stadium was the Nanjing Olympic Sports Centre. The club was previously known as Jiangsu Sainty F.C. from 2000 to 2016 and Jiangsu Suning F.C. from 2016 to 2021. The club's last owner was Suning Appliance Group, a sister company of Suning.com.

The team was founded in 1958 as Jiangsu Provincial Team. The modern professional football club was established in March 1994, and was one of the founding members of the first fully professional top-flight league in China participating in the 1994 Chinese Jia-A League season. It faced relegation in that campaign, but the team went on to win promotion back into the top-flight at the end of the 2008 league season.

The 2020 Chinese Super League saw the club win their first, and only, top-flight championship: three months later, the club was dissolved.

== History ==
The club was founded in April 1958 as Jiangsu Provincial Team by the local government and took part in the 1959 Chinese National Games where they placed twelfth. They joined the top tier of the gradually expanding Chinese football league system in 1960; finishing nineteenth out of twenty-five teams. By 1963, the league had expanded to thirty-nine teams and the Chinese Football Association decided they needed to reduce the number of participants in the league to twenty for the following season. Jiangsu finished seventh within their group stages, which relegated them from the league system. In 1964, they did not take part in any of the divisions but returned to play in the second tier in 1965 where they came seventh in the group stages.

The Chinese Cultural Revolution halted the league for several seasons. When it returned in 1973, Jiangsu was placed back into the top tier where they finished the league in eleventh. Jiangsu's time in the top tier did not last very long, and at the end of the 1978 season they were relegated to the second division. For the next several years, Jiangsu remained a second-tier club apart from a one-season top-tier stint in 1988. However, in 1992 it won the second tier title which guaranteed the club promotion to the country's first fully professional first-tier league in 1994, the Chinese Jia-A League, irrespective of where it finished in the 1993 season.

In March 1994, the club gained sponsorship and changed its name to Jiangsu Maint to comply with the requirements to take part in the 1994 Chinese Jia-A League season. it struggled with professionalism on and off the field, and was relegated at the end of the season. The stricter operational costs of the league resulted in the club struggling financially, which was exacerbated by also losing its sponsorship. Over time, the club gained some financial support from several major Chinese businesses including Jiangsu TV, Jinling Petrochemical Company, several Jiangsu tobacco companies in addition to some international investment companies. The club changed its name to Jiangsu Jiajia as a result of sponsorship; however, its improved financial stability did not prevent relegation to the third tier at the end of the 1996 season. The club spent only one season in the third division before gaining promotion by winning the 1997 title.

On 7 January 2000, the manufacturing company Jiangsu Sainty International Group took over the club and changed the club's name to Jiangsu Sainty. The new owners did not get off to the best of starts when it was discovered they were unable to prevent some of their players and coaches from taking bribes; maleficence was shown to have taken place in the 6 October game of the 2001 season in a 4–2 loss to Chengdu Wuniu. The offending participants were banned for a year while the club had three months to reform and re-apply for a Chinese Football Association playing license. After promising to clean up the club, the team lingered in the second tier for several years until they brought in Pei Encai to manage the team, which resulted in a division title and promotion at the end of the 2008 season.

The introduction of Serbian manager Dragan Okuka during the 2011 league season saw a significant improvement in league table finishes; a fourth-place finish at the end of the campaign and a runners-up position in the 2012 season. Off the field, the Jiangsu Sainty International Group was merged into Guoxin Group in 2011 to form Jiangsu Guoxin Investment Group Limited; this saw the Guoxin Group become the owner of the club. The club's name remained as Jiangsu Sainty F.C. until January 2014, when this changed to Jiangsu Guoxin-Sainty F.C.

On the field under Dragan Okuka the team had a difficult 2013 league season and were almost relegated, leading to the club deciding not to renew his contract. By the 2015 league season Romanian manager Dan Petrescu was brought into Jiangsu and in 2015 the team won the Chinese FA Cup for the first time and qualified for the 2016 AFC Champions League. On 21 December 2015 the club was purchased by Suning Appliance Group for ¥523 million; its name was changed to Jiangsu Suning F.C.

According to Forbes, Jiangsu was the fourth-wealthiest football team in China, with a team value of $144 million, and an estimated revenue of $36 million in 2015.

In January 2016, Jiangsu Suning broke its transfer fee record twice in the same window, with a fee of £25 million paid for Ramires from Chelsea FC, and later fellow Brazilian Alex Teixeira for a fee of €50 million (£37 million) from Shakhtar Donetsk. The club went on to have one successful season, finishing second in the 2016 Chinese Super League and the 2016 Chinese FA Cup. It was the club's second straight appearance in the Finals of the Chinese FA Cup. In 2017 the team reached the knockout stages of the 2017 AFC Champions League for the first time in their history. However, they missed the Champions League for the next two years, 2018 and 2019, due to struggles in domestic competitions.

On 12 November 2020, Jiangsu Suning were crowned champions of the Chinese Super League for the first time in club history with a 2–1 aggregate victory over Guangzhou Evergrande in the finals. Goals from Éder and Alex Teixeira secured the title.

On 1 February 2021, Jiangsu Suning changed their name to Jiangsu F.C. to meet a "neutral name" requirement by the Chinese Football Association.

On 28 February 2021, the parent company Suning Holdings Group announced that operations were going to cease immediately alongside the women and youth teams due to financial difficulties.

== Naming history ==
Jiangsu Suning F.C. logo (2016–2020)

- 1958: Jiangsu Province Football Team (江苏省男子足球队)
- 1994: Jiangsu Maint Football Club (江苏迈特足球俱乐部)
- 1995: Jiangsu Football Club (江苏足球队)
- 1996: Jiangsu Gige Football Club (江苏金陵石化加佳足球俱乐部 (江苏加佳))
- 2000: Jiangsu Sainty Football Club (江苏舜天足球俱乐部)
- 2014: Jiangsu Guoxin-Sainty Football Club (江苏国信舜天足球俱乐部)
- 2016: Jiangsu Suning Football Club (江苏苏宁足球俱乐部)
- 2021: Jiangsu Football Club (江苏足球俱乐部)

== Rivalries ==
The club had rivalries with neighbouring Zhejiang province's Zhejiang Energy Greentown F.C. from Hangzhou as well as Shanghai based clubs Shanghai Greenland Shenhua and Shanghai SIPG where they contest the Yangtze Delta Derby. The rivalry with Shanghai Greenland Shenhua was the oldest and fiercest and can be dated as far back as the 1960 league championship. When Jiangsu were relegated to the second tier in 1978, it put a halt to the rivalry between the two clubs. The rivalry was not properly reignited until 2009 when both teams were simultaneously back in the top flight and the hostilities resumed. A direct fight for silverware between these two teams finally emerged when they competed in the 2015 Chinese FA Cup final, which saw Jiangsu won 1–0 to claim their first Cup win.

The Nanjing derby was a local inner city derby against Nanjing Yoyo F.C. that started when Nanjing Yoyo moved into the same city as Jiangsu and into their former home ground of Wutaishan Stadium. Their first meeting occurred in Nanjing Yoyo's home ground on 19 July 2003 in a second-tier league game, which ended in a 1–1 draw. For six seasons the two teams fought to be the dominant club within Nanjing City with Jiangsu predominately the stronger side with four wins, seven draws and only one defeat. When Jiangsu won promotion to the top tier at the end of the 2008 league season, it put a halt to the derby. Nanjing Yoyo were subsequently dissolved in May, 2011 due to financial difficulties.

=== Managerial history ===
Managers who have coached the club and team since Jiangsu Sainty became a professional club back in 1994.

- (China) Liu Pingyu (1994–95)
- (China) Wei Ritun (1996)
- (China) Hu Zhigang (1997)
- (China) Yang Yumin (1998–99)
- (China) Gu Mingchang (2000)
- (Federal Republic of Yugoslavia) Željko Banjac (2000)
- (Ukraine) Leonid Koltun (2000–01)
- (Bosnia and Herzegovina) Boško Antić (2001)
- (China) Liu Pingyu (2002)
- (Ukraine) Leonid Koltun (2002–03)
- (China) Chi Shangbin (1 Feb 2004 – 13 Jul 2004)
- (Ukraine) Leonid Koltun (2004)
- (China) Wang Baoshan (2005)
- (China) Ma Lin (2006)
- (China) Li Hongbin (2006)
- (Serbia) Branko Vojinović (2007)
- (China) Pei Encai (21 Dec 2007 – 31 Dec 2010)
- (Slovakia) Ján Kocian (1 Jan 2011 – 5 May 2011)
- (Serbia) Dragan Okuka (10 May 2011 – 5 Nov 2013)
- (China) Gao Hongbo (8 Nov 2013 – 29 Jun 2015)
- (Romania) Dan Petrescu (12 Jul 2015 – 3 Jun 2016)
- (China) Tang Jing (3 Jun 2016 – 30 Jun 2016) (caretaker)
- (South Korea) Choi Yong-soo (1 Jul 2016 – 2 Jun 2017)
- (China) Li Jinyu (2 Jun 2017 – 11 Jun 2017) (caretaker)
- (Italy) Fabio Capello (11 Jun 2017 – 28 Mar 2018)
- (Romania) Cosmin Olăroiu (28 Mar 2018 – 28 Feb 2021)

== Honours ==
This list contains both honors received as a professional team and as a semi-professional team.

=== League ===
- Chinese Super League
  - Champions: 2020
- Chinese Jia B League/Chinese League One (Second tier)
  - Winners: 1992, 2008
- Chinese Yi League/Chinese League Two (Third tier)
  - Winners: 1997

=== Cups ===
- Chinese FA Cup
  - Winners: 2015
  - Runners-up: 2014, 2016
- Chinese FA Super Cup
  - Winners: 2013
  - Runners-up: 2016, 2017

== Results ==
=== All-time league rankings ===
As of the end of 2019 season.

Year	Div	Pld	W	D	L	GF	GA	GD	Pts	Pos.	FA Cup	Super Cup	League Cup	AFC	Att./G	Stadium
1960	1	14	3	4	7	9	15	−6	8^{[1]}	19	DNE	–	–	-		
1961	1	7	0	3	4	3	8	−5	3^{[2]}	10^{[2]}	NH	–	–	-		
1962	1	17	6	0	11	16	38	−22	4^{[1]}	19	NH	–	–	-		
1963	1	14	4	6	4	7	11	−4	7^{[2]}	7^{[2]}	NH	–	–	-		
1965	2	10								7^{[2]}	NH	–	–	-		
1973	1	19	10	5	4	32	13	19	15^{[1]}	11	NH	–	–	-		
1974	1	22	11	2	9	41	33	8	9^{[1]}	21	NH	–	–	-		
1976	1	8	0	2	6	2	18	−16	2	9^{[2]}	NH	–	–	-		
1977	1	16	6	5	5	19	21	−2	5^{[1]}	15	NH	–	–	–		
1978	1	30	3	12	15	18	50	−32	18	14	NH	–	–	-		
1979	2	42	17	11	14	43	41	2	45	10	NH	–	–	-		
1980	2	30	12	9	9	34	24	10	33	7	NH	–	–	-		
1981	2	30	13	–	17				26	12	NH	–	–	-		
1982	2	30	16	–	14	31	36	32	4	7	NH	–	–	-		
1983	2	15	5	–	10				10	13	NH	–	–	-		
1984	2	8								7^{[2]}	DNQ	–	–	-		
1986	2	15							5^{[1]}	4	R1	–	–	DNQ		
1987	2	20	6	9	5	20	18	2	21	5	NH	–	–	DNQ		
1988	1	20	6	5	9	18	21	−3	26	14	NH	–	–	DNQ		
1989	2	22	9	5	8	23	16	7	36.5	5	NH	–	–	DNQ		
1990	2	22	7	8	7	18	18	0	29	5	R1	–	–	DNQ		
1991	2	16	3	10	3	15	13	2	17	6	QF	–	–	DNQ		
1992	2	14	6	2	6	13	12	1	6^{[1]}	W^{[3]}	R1	–	–	DNQ		Wutaishan Stadium
1993	2	5	2	0/0	3	3	6	−3	4	5^{[2]}	NH	–	–	DNQ		Wutaishan Stadium
1994	1	22	1	8	13	13	44	−31	10	12	NH	–	–	DNQ		Wutaishan Stadium
1995	2	22	6	9	7	20	21	−1	27	7	R1	DNQ	–	DNQ		Wutaishan Stadium
1996	2	22	1	7	14	8	32	−24	10	12	R1	DNQ	–	DNQ		
1997	3	17	11	3	3	25	9	16	6^{[1]}	W	DNQ	DNQ	–	DNQ		
1998	2	22	10	2	10	24	23	1	32	4	R2	DNQ	–	DNQ		Wutaishan Stadium
1999	2	22	6	6	10	23	28	−5	24	9	R1	DNQ	–	DNQ		Wutaishan Stadium
2000	2	22	10	6	6	30	27	3	36	3	R1	DNQ	–	DNQ		Wutaishan Stadium
2001	2	22	11	5	6	29	20	9	38	5	R2	DNQ	–	DNQ	15,455	Wutaishan Stadium
2002	2	22	7	10	5	18	13	5	31	5	R1	DNQ	–	DNQ	6,818	Wutaishan Stadium
2003	2	26	13	6	7	37	25	12	45	4	R1	DNQ		DNQ	9,923	Yangzhou Stadium
2004	2	32	13	11	8	35	24	11	50	6	R1	NH	DNQ	DNQ	4,959	Wutaishan Stadium
2005	2	26	13	8	5	43	21	22	47	5	R1	NH	DNQ	DNQ	4,225	Wutaishan Stadium
2006	2	24	9	6	9	37	31	6	33	6	R2	NH	NH	DNQ	5,317	Wutaishan Stadium
2007	2	24	14	6	4	41	21	20	48	3	NH	NH	NH	DNQ	14,167	Nanjing Olympic Sports Centre
2008	2	24	19	2	3	56	24	23	59	W	NH	NH	NH	DNQ	7,692	Nanjing Olympic Sports Centre
2009	1	30	9	10	11	30	30	0	37	10	NH	NH	NH	DNQ	15,976	Nanjing Olympic Sports Centre
2010	1	30	8	11	11	27	27	0	35	11	NH	NH	NH	DNQ	10,667	Nanjing Olympic Sports Centre
2011	1	30	14	5	11	43	28	15	47	4	R1	NH	NH	DNQ	17,170	Nanjing Olympic Sports Centre
2012	1	30	14	12	4	49	29	20	54	RU	R3	DNQ	NH	DNQ	31,163	Nanjing Olympic Sports Centre
2013	1	30	7	11	12	32	39	−7	32	13	QF	W	NH	Group	28,808	Nanjing Olympic Sports Centre; Zhenjiang Sports and Exhibition Center^{[4]}
2014	1	30	9	10	11	37	45	−8	37	8	RU	DNQ	NH	DNQ	24,349	Nanjing Olympic Sports Centre; Zhenjiang Sports and Exhibition Center^{[4]}
2015	1	30	9	8	13	39	48	−9	35	9	W	DNQ	NH	DNQ	26,858	Nanjing Olympic Sports Centre
2016	1	30	17	6	7	53	33	20	57	RU	RU	RU	NH	Group	38,992	Nanjing Olympic Sports Centre
2017	1	30	7	11	12	40	45	−5	32	12	QF	RU	NH	R16	32,697	Nanjing Olympic Sports Centre
2018	1	30	13	9	8	48	33	15	48	5	QF	DNQ	NH	DNQ	32,508	Nanjing Olympic Sports Centre
2019	1	30	15	8	7	60	41	19	53	4	R16	DNQ	NH	DNQ	27,508	Nanjing Olympic Sports Centre
2020	1	20^{[5]}	10^{[5]}	8^{[5]}	2^{[5]}	30^{[5]}	19^{[5]}	11^{[5]}	26^{[2]}	W	RU	DNQ	NH	DNQ	–^{[6]}	–^{[6]}

- No league games in 1959, 1966–1972, and 1975; Jiangsu did not compete in 1964 and 1985
- ^1 In final group stage.
- ^2 In group stage.
- ^3 Promoted to the 1994 first tier.
- ^4 Several home matches played in Zhenjiang Sports and Exhibition Center as 2013 Asian Youth Games and 2014 Summer Youth Olympics were held in Nanjing Olympic Sports Centre.
- ^5 Includes playoffs.
- ^6 The 2020 Chinese Super League was held behind closed doors most of the time, attendance and stadium not applicable.

Key

	China top division
	China second division
	China third division
W	Winners
RU	Runners-up
3	Third place
	Relegated

- Pld = Played
- W = Games won
- D = Games drawn
- L = Games lost
- F = Goals for
- A = Goals against
- Pts = Points
- Pos = Final position
- DNQ = Did not qualify
- DNE = Did not enter
- NH = Not Held
- – = Does Not Exist
- R1 = Round 1
- R2 = Round 2
- R3 = Round 3
- R4 = Round 4
- F = Final
- SF = Semi-finals
- QF = Quarter-finals
- R16 = Round of 16
- Group = Group stage
- GS2 = Second Group stage
- QR1 = First Qualifying Round
- QR2 = Second Qualifying Round
- QR3 = Third Qualifying Round

=== Continental results ===
Season	Competition	Round	Opposition	Home	Away	Rank /Agg.
2013	AFC Champions League	Group stage	(South Korea) FC Seoul	0–2	1–5	3rd
2013	AFC Champions League	Group stage	(Japan) Vegalta Sendai	0–0	2–1	3rd
2013	AFC Champions League	Group stage	(Thailand) Buriram United	2–0	0–2	3rd
2016	AFC Champions League	Group stage	(Vietnam) Becamex Binh Duong	3–0	1–1	3rd
2016	AFC Champions League	Group stage	(South Korea) Jeonbuk Hyundai Motors	3–2	2–2	3rd
2016	AFC Champions League	Group stage	(Japan) FC Tokyo	1–2	0–0	3rd
2017	AFC Champions League	Group stage	(South Korea) Jeju United	1–2	1–0	1st
2017	AFC Champions League	Group stage	(Australia) Adelaide United	2–1	1–0	1st
2017	AFC Champions League	Group stage	(Japan) Gamba Osaka	3–0	1–0	1st
2017	AFC Champions League	Round of 16	(China) Shanghai SIPG	2–3	1–2	3–5

== Asian clubs ranking ==
As of 18 February 2018.

Current Rank	Country	Team
61	(Thailand)	Bangkok United
62	(Iran)	Naft Tehran
63	(China)	Guangzhou R&F
64	(China)	Jiangsu Suning FC
65	(Indonesia)	Arema
66	(Saudi Arabia)	Al Fateh
67	(Australia)	Western Sydney Wanderers

== See also ==
- Jiangsu Football City League
