= Su Ning =

- Born: January 31, 1953; Xiaoyi, Shanxi, China
- Died: April 29, 1991 (aged 37–38); Harbin, Heilongjiang, China
- Occupations: Major, exemplary cadres

Su Ning (Chinese: 苏宁; pinyin: Sū Níng) (January 31, 1953 – April 29, 1991) was a Chinese military officer.

== Career ==
As a soldier, he was the top-ranked trainee. In the army, he worked as a soldier, a platoon leader, a company commander, a staff officer, and a battalion commander. He led his group to victory in a military skills competition. He wrote more than 70 pages about Army technology.

== Death ==
On April 21, 1991, Su Ning was commanding a team to train how to throw live grenades. One trainee threw a grenade. It hit a wall and bounced back. Su Ning shouted out for everyone to drop to the ground and he moved to get rid of it. As he picked it up, the grenade exploded. He was sent to hospital for treatment; after 8 days, he died and the soldier survived.

In 1993, the Central Military Commission granted him the honorary title, "Model of all officers dedicated to the modernization of national defence" (献身国防现代化的模范干部).

The regiment in which Su Ning served was renamed "Su Ning Regiment" (Chinese: 苏宁团; pinyin: Sū Níng Túan).

== Personal life ==
When Su Ning died, his son was eight. In 1998, Su Renren (Chinese: 苏任韧; pinyin: Sū Rénrèn) enlisted in Su Ning Regiment. He received a Military master's degree in 2007 and returned to Su Ning Regiment. He successively held the post of platoon leader, company political instructor and secretary of the political department.

== In popular culture ==
The movie The Artillery Major (炮兵少校) is based on Su Ning. The director is Zhao Weiheng (Chinese: 赵为恒; pinyin: Zhào Wéihéng), the scenarists are Hao Zhongsu(Chinese: 郝中夙; pinyin: Hǎo Zhōngsù) and Du Shoulin (Chinese: 杜守林; pinyin: Dù Shǒulín). The film starred Zhou Lijing(Chinese: 周里京; pinyin: Zhōu lǐjīng) and Lü Xiaohe (Chinese: 吕晓禾; pinyin: Lǚ Xiǎohé). It was made by Changchun Film Studio (长春电影制片厂) in 1993.
