= Zhang Jindong =

Chinese businessman (born 1963)

- Born: March 1963 (age 63); Tianchang, Anhui, China
- Education: Nanjing Normal University
- Occupations: Entrepreneur; Politician
- Known for: Owner of Suning Holdings Group; Major shareholder of Suning Appliance Group; Second largest shareholder of Suning.com; Owner of Suning Real Estate; Former shareholder of Inter Milan
Board member of
Suning Holdings Group	(managing director)
Suning.com	(honorary chairman)
- Children: Zhang Kangyang

Member of the 10th National Committee of the CPPCC for All-China Youth Federation
- In office March 2003 – March 2008

Member of the 11th National Committee of the CPPCC for ACFIC
- In office March 2008 – March 2013

Member of the 12th National Committee of the CPPCC for ACFIC
- In office March 2013 – March 2018

Member of the 11th Jiangsu People's Congress for Nanjing
- In office 2008–2013

Personal details
- Other political affiliations: All-China Youth Federation; All-China Federation of Industry and Commerce

Zhang Jindong
- Simplified Chinese: 张近东
- Traditional Chinese: 張近東
Transcriptions
Standard Mandarin
- Hanyu Pinyin: Zhāng Jìndōng

Zhang Jindong (simplified Chinese: 张近东; traditional Chinese: 張近東; pinyin: Zhāng Jìndōng; born March 1963) is a Chinese entrepreneur. He is one of the founders and the current honorary chairman of the Suning.com, headquartered in Nanjing, Jiangsu. He also owned 100% stake in Suning Holdings Group, 65% stake in Suning Real Estate as well as 48.1% stake in Suning Appliance Group as the second largest shareholder. His company also was the majority owner of Italian football club Inter Milan until May 2024.

He was also the managing director and general manager of Suning Holdings Group, chairman of Suning.com.

== Biography ==
Zhang Jindong was born in Tianchang, Anhui Province in 1963. He graduated from Chinese department at Nanjing Normal University.

Zhang Jindong together with his older brother Zhang Guiping (Chinese: 张桂平) opened a shop on Ninghai Road (Chinese: 宁海路) corner Jiangsu Road in Nanjing, selling air conditioning and related products in 1990. The brand Suning came from choosing one word each from Jiang-su and Ning-hai; the roads themselves were named after the city and province of the same name. Later Zhang Guiping exited the business and shifted into real estate, now known as Suning Universal. Zhang Jindong did however, also start his own real estate company Suning Real Estate some time later.

Zhang Jindong further developed his small shop into a business group, the Suning Group, within 15 years. He also founded and co-founded Suning Holdings Group and Suning Appliance Group respectively, as unlisted portions of his collection of businesses, leaving Suning.com (was known as Suning Commerce Group and other names) as the only listing company. In 2013's Hurun Report's China Rich List, Zhang was ranked No.9 with $6.4 billion. Zhang Jindong was ranked 28th in 2015 Forbes's China Rich List.

He was also elected to the National Committee of the Chinese People's Political Consultative Conference, a senior governmental body. He was a member of the Provincial People's Congress, but not a member of the National People's Congress.

On 6 June 2016, Zhang Jindong, via his own private holding company Suning Holdings Group, signed a contract to purchase the majority stake in Italian football club Inter Milan, by purchasing existing shares and through recapitalization. The deal was approved by the extraordinary general meeting on 28 June 2016, which after the deal, Suning Holdings Group owned 68.55% shares.

In July 2021, Zhang Jindong stepped down as chairman of Suning.com, in which he holds the role of honorary chairman.

Forbes estimated his net worth to be around US$7.4 billion in 2021.

== Personal life ==
His son Zhang Kangyang (Steven) owns a 10% stake in Suning Real Estate, one of his privately held companies. Suning Holdings Group acquired a majority stake of Inter Milan football club in 2016. After the acquisition, his son Steven became a member of Inter's board of directors and since 2018, its chairman. Jindong is not a member of the board himself.
