= Zhang Kangyang =

Chinese businessman (born 1991)

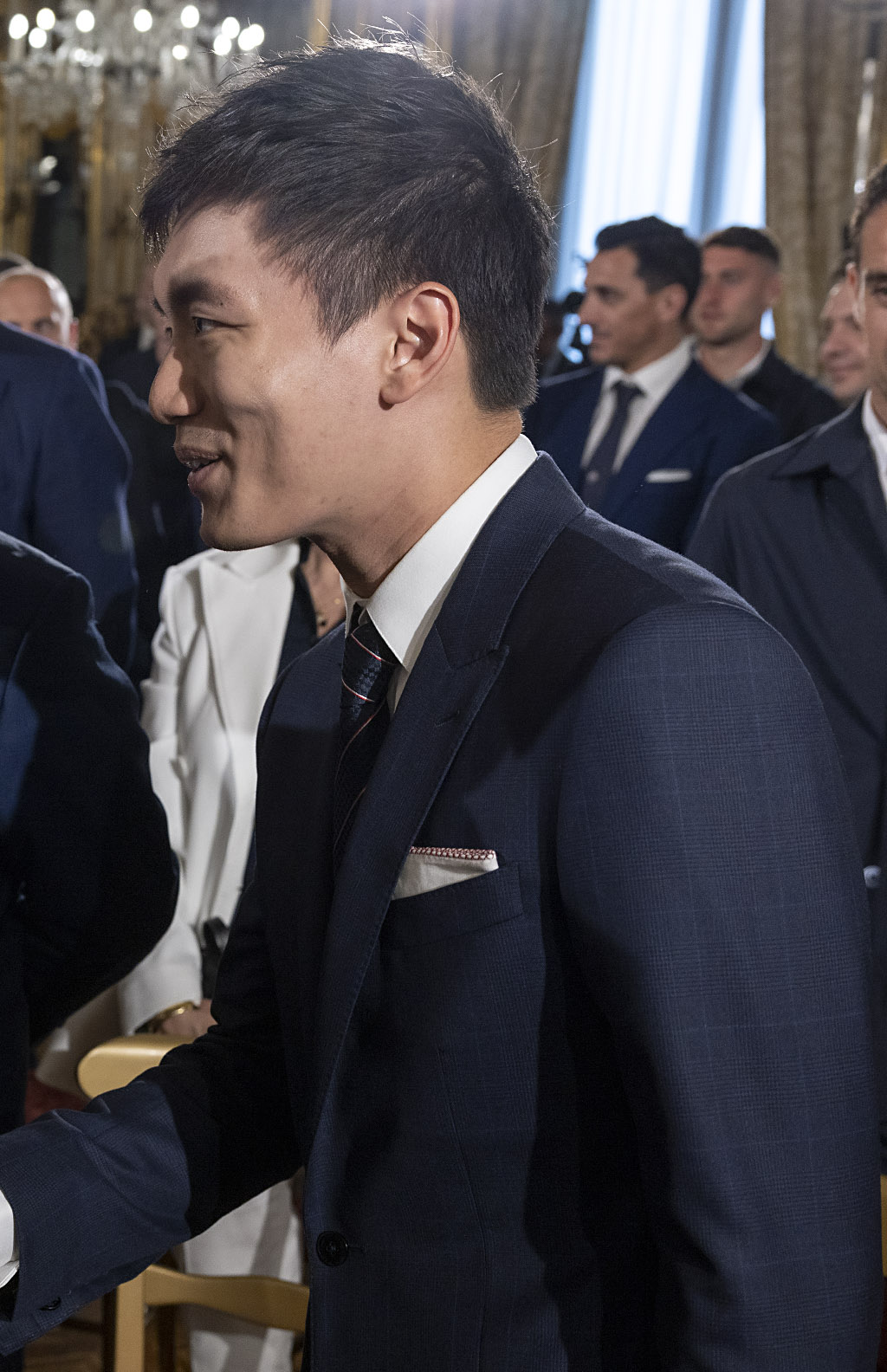
- Zhang in 2023

Chairman of Inter Milan
- In office 2018–2024
- Preceded by: Erick Thohir
- Succeeded by: Giuseppe Marotta

Personal details
- Born: 张康阳; 21 December 1991 (age 34) Nanjing, Jiangsu, China
- Parent: Zhang Jindong (father)
- Education: Wharton School of the University of Pennsylvania
- Occupation: Businessman
- Known for: Former chairman of Inter Milan

Zhang Kangyang
- Simplified Chinese: 张康阳
- Traditional Chinese: 張康陽
Transcriptions
Standard Mandarin
- Hanyu Pinyin: Zhāng Kāngyáng

Zhang Kangyang (Chinese: 张康阳; born 21 December 1991), known as Steven Zhang, is a Chinese businessman and former chairman of Italian football club Inter Milan.

== Biography ==
Born in Nanjing, Zhang is the son of Chinese billionaire Zhang Jindong, founder and chairman of the Suning Holdings Group. He was featured in Fortune China magazine's "40 Under 40" list.

As the President of Suning International, Steven Zhang has the ultimate responsibility for spearheading the business's international expansion and future ambitions. Suning International is part of Suning Holdings Group – the commercial giant ranked second among the top 500 non-state-owned enterprises in China and list of largest private non-governmental companies by revenue with annual revenues of RMB 665.3 billion (approximately US$103 billion).

They are also the owners of Suning.com, a smart retail subsidiary currently ranked China's most valuable retail brand and listed on the Fortune Global 500 List of the world's largest companies for three successive years, with a total brand value of RMB 269.198 billion and an operating income in over S$39 billion.

== Football ==
=== Inter Milan ===
In October 2018, Steven Zhang became the youngest ever chairman of Inter Milan (or simply Inter). Having been instrumental in Suning Holdings Group's acquisition of Inter in 2016, he then held a position on the Board and took over the management of operations for the club.

In 2019, Inter's enterprise value rose over 41% to EUR 692 million, the highest growth of any club in Europe. Inter is also ranked in the Top 10 for Club Stadia (Venue Performance).

In February 2020, Inter Milan sued Major League Soccer's Inter Miami for trademark infringement, stating that the term "Inter" is synonymous with its club and no one else. As of 2022, the case ended in Inter Miami's favour.

In April 2020, Zhang heavily criticized Paolo Dal Pino on Instagram, the president of Serie A, over his handling of the COVID-19 outbreak among footballers and clubs. Unpopular with multiple Serie A club owners, and not just Inter for general incompetence, Dal Pino would eventually resign in February 2022, after two years in charge.

In July 2022, media reported that the Hong Kong High Court handed down its summary judgement against Zhang for unpaid (USD)$225m debt.

On 22 May 2024, Zhang lost control of Inter Milan and Oaktree Capital Management assumed ownership of Inter Milan following the default of Suning Holdings Group on a substantial loan given in May 2021 to the club.

==== Silverware successes ====
During the 2019–20 season, Inter finished second in the league and finished as runners-up in the final of the 2019–20 UEFA Europa League – the club's best performance in Europe since their 2009–10 UEFA Champions League victory.

Inter then won the 2020–21 Serie A with four rounds to spare, the nineteenth championship in the history of the club and eleven years after the last triumph in 2009–2010. Zhang became the first foreign owner to win the Scudetto in Italy, and the first Chinese owner to win a domestic top-division European club championship.

On 12 January 2022, Inter Milan won the Italian Super Cup, the second trophy of Zhang's chairmanship. On 11 May, Inter Milan won the Coppa Italia, the third trophy under his management.

During the 2022-23 season, Inter won the second consecutive Italian Super Cup, on the King Fahd International Stadium in Riyadh, Saudi Arabia, it was the fourth trophy during Zhang's tenure as chairman. On 24 May 2023, Inter won the second consecutive Coppa Italia by beating Fiorentina in the final.

On 10 June, at the Atatürk Olympic Stadium in Istanbul, Inter played the sixth European Cup/Champions League final in their history, after victories in the previous ones in 1964, 1965 and 2010 and defeats in those of 1967 and 1972. In the unprecedented match against the English team Manchester City F.C. (the two sides never faced each other before in UEFA competitions), the Nerazzurri were narrowly beaten by a goal from Rodri, thus missing the opportunity to win for the fourth time in the history of the top continental competition. This was the second European final since Zhang has been president of Inter.

On 22 January 2024, Inter won the eighth Supercoppa Italiana, played in Riyadh, Saudi Arabia, at the KSU Stadium, beating Lazio in the semi-final 3 to 0 and Napoli 1 to 0 in the 2023 Supercoppa Italiana final. Zhang became the third most successful Inter president in the team's history, behind Angelo Moratti and Massimo Moratti, and ahead of Ernesto Pellegrini and Ivanoe Fraizzoli, with 6 trophies won out of eight finals played.

=== Member of the European Club Association ===
Since March 2018 Steven Zhang has been on the UEFA Club Competitions Committee and is the only member from Asia. From September 2019, he was a member of the European Club Association (ECA) Executive Board. the body established in 2008 and recognised by UEFA and FIFA, representing the interests of professional association football clubs in Europe. He is the first Chinese representative among 24 members of the Board. Zhang resigned from it in April 2021.
