= Suning Appliance Group =

Chinese holding company

Suning Appliance Group Co., Ltd.
- Native name: 苏宁电器集团有限公司
- Formerly: Jiangsu Suning Appliance; Jiangsu Suning Appliance Group
- Company type: Private
- Industry: Real estate, sports club
- Founded: 24 November 1999
- Founder: Liu Xiaomeng; Zhang Jindong; Sun Weimin; Chen Jinfeng
- Headquarters: 68 Huaihai Road, Nanjing, China
- Key people: Bu Yang (chairwoman)
- Net income: CN¥610 million (2010)
- Total assets: CN¥20.278 billion (June 2011)
- Total equity: CN¥3.507 billion (June 2011)
- Owner: Bu Yang (49.1%); Zhang Jindong (48.1%); Sun Weimin (2.8%)
- Footnotes / references in separate balance sheet (unaudited)

Suning Appliance Group Co., Ltd. (Note: The name was also transliterated as "Suning Electrical Appliances Group"; The company used the name "Suning Appliance Group" to issue bond.) (Chinese: 苏宁电器集团有限公司) is a Chinese holding company that is the third largest shareholder of Suning Appliance (also known as Suning Domestic Appliance in 1996, Suning Appliance Chain Store (Group) in 2001, Suning Commerce Group from 2013 to 2018, and Suning.com now), after Zhang Jindong (founder of Suning) and Alibaba Group.

The company was formerly known as Jiangsu Suning Appliance Co., Ltd. (Chinese: 江苏苏宁电器有限公司) and Jiangsu Suning Appliance Group Co., Ltd. (Chinese: 江苏苏宁电器集团有限公司).

== History ==
As of 2002, Jiangsu Suning Appliance Group Co., Ltd. was owned by the ex-senior staff of Suning Appliance Co., Ltd., namely Liu Xiaomeng, Zhang Jindong, Sun Weimin (Chinese: 孙为民, CEO of Suning) and Chen Jinfeng (Chinese: 陈金凤) for 42%, 28%, 18% and 12% stake respectively. The company owned several real estate and leased to Suning Domestic Appliance. When Suning Domestic Appliance was listed in Shenzhen Stock Exchange, Jiangsu Suning Appliance Group owned 18.29% stake.

In 2009 the Chinese name of the company was changed from Jiangsu Suning Appliance Group Co., Ltd. to Suning Appliance Group Co., Ltd..

Around the 2010s, Liu and Chen withdrew as a shareholder of Suning Appliance Group Co., Ltd. The latter still owned an equity stake in Suning Commerce Group directly. Moreover, Bu Yang (Chinese: 卜扬), a senior staff of Suning Commerce Group, was introduced as a shareholder of Suning Appliance Group Co., Ltd..

In 2013 Zhang owned 39.75% stake, Bu owned 40.17% and Sun owned 20.08%. In the same year, via Hong Kong incorporated subsidiary Suning International Limited, Suning Appliance Group purchased about 1% stake in Hong Kong listed company Hydoo International Holding Limited.

As of the first quarter of 2016, Zhang owned 48.10% stake in Suning Appliance Group Co., Ltd. as the second largest shareholder, Bu was the major shareholder for 49.1% stake, with Sun was the third for 2.8% stake.

Suning Appliance Group Co., Ltd. also owned 7.37% stake in Japanese listed company LAOX, which after Suning Commerce and Nihon Kanko Menzei as the third largest shareholder.

As of 2015, Suning Appliance Group still leasing some properties to Suning Commerce, for example a floor area of 13,182 sq.m in Suning Galaxy International Plaza (Chinese: 银河大廈 aka 苏宁银河国际广场), on 1 Shanxi Road, Nanjing.

In 2016 Suning Appliance Group Co., Ltd. purchased 100% stake of Jiangsu Football Club, and in 2021 announced that the club would immediately cease operations.

In mid-2016 Suning Appliance Group Co., Ltd. became the third largest shareholder for 15.62% stake, after new shares was issued to Alibaba Group.

Suning Appliance Group also owned 25% stake in Suning Real Estate. In 2017, the company subscribed CN¥20 billion new shares of Hengda Real Estate, a subsidiary of Evergrande Group.

== Subsidiaries ==
- Jiangsu F.C.
  - Jiangsu Lady Football Club
- Novotel Nanjing Central Suning
