= Suning.com =

Chinese retail company

Suning.com Co., Ltd.
- Formerly: Suning Domestic Appliance; Suning Domestic Appliance (Group); Suning Appliance Chain Store (Group); Suning Appliance; Suning Commerce Group
- Type: Public
- Traded as: SZSE: 002024
- Industry: Retail
- Founded: 1990 (predecessor); 15 May 1996 (date of incorporation of Suning Domestic Appliance)
- Founder: Zhang Jindong
- Headquarters: Nanjing, China
- Area served: China (including Hong Kong) and Japan
- Key people: Huang Mingduan (chairman); Jun Ren (president and director); Wei Huang (secretary of president)
- Revenue: ▼CN¥252.296 billion (US$39.610 billion, 2020)
- Operating income: ▼CN¥−5.015 billion (US$787 million, 2020)
- Net income: ▼CN¥−4.275 billion (US$671 million, 2020)
- Total assets: ▼CN¥212.075 billion (US$33.295 billion, 2020)
- Total equity: ▼CN¥76.831 billion (US$12.062 billion, 2020)
Owner
Alibaba Group	(19.99%)
Zhang Jindong	(17.62%)
New Retail Innovation Fund	(16.96%)
Suning Holdings Group	(2.73%)
Suning Appliance Group	(1.39%)
Other shareholders	(41.31%)
- Number of employees: 69,398 (2 August 2021)
- Divisions: Suning Commerce R&D Center USA
Subsidiaries
Laox	(41.85%)
Suning.com	(100%)
Suning Hong Kong	(100%)
Tiantian Express
PPTV	(44%)
Yunwang Wandian	(70%)
Carrefour China	(80%)
TCL Technology	(25%)

Chinese name
- Simplified Chinese: 苏宁易购集团股份有限公司
Transcriptions

Chinese short name
- Simplified Chinese: 苏宁易购
Transcriptions
Standard Mandarin
- Hanyu Pinyin: Sūníng Yúnshāng

former Chinese name
- Simplified Chinese: 苏宁云商集团股份有限公司
- Traditional Chinese: 蘇寕雲商集團股份有限公司
Transcriptions
Standard Mandarin
- Hanyu Pinyin: Sūníng Yúnshāng Jítuán Gǔfènyǒuxiàngōngsī

former Chinese short name
- Simplified Chinese: 苏宁云商
- Traditional Chinese: 蘇寕雲商
- Literal meaning: Suning Cloud Commerce
Transcriptions
- Website: suning.cn

Suning.com Co., Ltd. (/ˈsunɪŋ/ SOO-ning), formerly Suning Commerce Group Co., Ltd., is one of the largest non-government retailers in China, headquartered in Nanjing, Jiangsu. Suning has more than 10,000 stores nationwide and its e-commerce platform, Suning.com ranks among top three Chinese B2C companies. The operation categories include physical merchandise, such as home appliances, 3C products, books, general merchandise, household commodities, cosmetics and baby care products, content products and service merchandise with the total number of SKU exceeding 3 million. It was listed on the Shenzhen Stock Exchange in 2004. In 2021, Suning.com ranked 328th on the Fortune Global 500 list.

Suning.com was ranked 9th on the list of the 15 Fastest Growing Ecommerce Companies in 2020 according to a report published by the international finance website "Insider Monkey", and ranked 2nd in "Total Online Retail Sales" in China.

== Business areas ==
Suning Commerce Group Co., Ltd. principally operates franchised retail shops of electronic appliances in China. The Company mainly offers colour televisions (TVs), audio and video (AV) players, disc players, refrigerators, washing machines, digital and information technology (IT) products, small household electronics, air conditioners, telecommunications products and other products. The company also provides installation and repair services for electronic appliances. As of 31 December 2010, the company had 1,311 stores in 231 cities across China. As of 30 June 2020, after the acquisition of the Carrefour supermarket network in China, Suning.Com owned 2,756 stores of various types:

- Suning Plaza (shopping malls) - 37
- 3C specialty shop (household appliances) - 2,108
- Suning.Com Stores - 197
- Carrefour supermarket - 240
- RedBaby brand stores (baby and maternity products) - 146
- Shops in Hong Kong - 28

There were 5,660 Suning.Com franchise stores, for a total of 8682. In the first quarter of 2021, another 831 stores were opened in June bringing the total to over 9000 cloud retail stores. Suning.com is present in China (the mainland China and Hong Kong S.A.R.) and Japan, in the retail industry, with over 10,000 stores.

The company has been on the Fortune Global 500 list since 2017.

Fortune Global 500 Rank History
Year	2017	2018	2019	2020	2021
Ranking	485	427	333	324	328

== History ==
On 26 December 1990, the predecessor of Suning was founded in Nanjing as an air-conditioner retail store. On 15 May 1996, 江苏苏宁交家电有限公司 (literally Suning Domestic Appliance Co., Ltd.) was incorporated. In 2000 the company was renamed into 江苏苏宁交家电(集团)有限公司 (literally Suning Domestic Appliance (Group) Co., Ltd.) and then Suning Appliance Chain Store (Group) Co., Ltd. (Chinese: 苏宁电器连锁集团股份有限公司).

In July 2004, Suning Appliance Chain Store (Group) was listed on SZSE. As of 31 December 2004, founder and chairman Zhang Jindong owned 35.12% stake, followed by Jiangsu Suning Appliance Co., Ltd. (Chinese: 江苏苏宁电器有限公司), which was the parent company of Suning Appliance Chain Store (Group) Co., Ltd., for 18.29% stake. Chen Jinfeng (Chinese: 陈金凤) owned 8.78% stake. Moreover, Liu Xiaomeng, Zhang Jindong, Sun Weimin (CEO of Suning) and Chen Jinfeng owned 42%, 28%, 18% and 12% stake respectively in Jiangsu Suning Appliance, as at 2002.

Suning Appliance Chain Store (Group) was renamed Suning Appliance Co., Ltd. (Chinese: 苏宁电器股份有限公司; lit. 'Suning Appliance', 'Company Limited by Share') in 2005.

In 2009 Suning Appliance purchased Hong Kong based retail chain Citicall (as Citicall Retail Management), which became Hongkong Suning Commerce Co., Ltd., for HK$35 million and not more than HK$180 million for fixed assets.

2011-, Suning's been gradually exploring "online and offline" multi-channel integration.

On 19 February 2013, Suning Appliance announced to change the company name to Suning Commerce Group Co., Ltd. (Chinese: 苏宁云商集团股份有限公司)

On 19 November 2013, the Suning US R&D Center and Silicon Valley Research Institute was inaugurated in the city Palo Alto in California. The president of Suning Holdings Group Zhang Jindong officially announced the launch of the world's first research institute. Suning had clearly released the One-Wing Internet Roadmap, facility search would advance Suning's online to offline (O2O) business model (business strategy that attracts potential customers from online channels to shop in physical stores ) and would strengthen its back office, which include big data, business intelligence, high performance computing, online banking to improve efficiency operating in the retail sector.

In October 2015 PPTV was sold to chairman Zhang Jindong via a subsidiary of Suning Culture Investment Management for US$398.4102 million, making a profit of RMB 1.355 billion. In 2015 financial year the comprehensive income of Suning Commerce Group in consolidated basis was just 1.01168 billion RMB.

In April 2016 Suning Commerce acquired 4.90% stake in Nubia Technology from chairman Zhang Jindong for 283.7 million RMB, proportional to Zhang's subscription in the capital increase of Nubia in December 2015.

On 3 June 2016 Suning Commerce Group issued about 1.86 billion new shares to Taobao (China) Software Co., Ltd., a subsidiary of Alibaba Group, for about 28 billion RMB. During the year the company sold some properties to Zhang, making extraordinary profit for the loss-making company.

In 2018, the listed company was renamed Suning.com Co., Ltd. (Chinese: 苏宁易购集团股份有限公司)

In 2019, Suning.com acquired 80% stake of the Chinese division of Carrefour. Also in 2019, Suning.Com acquired 37 department stores from the Wanda Group for 2.7 billion RMB. Was ranked as the largest omnichannel retailer in China and as the most valuable retail brand in China by the World Brand Lab, with a total brand value of US$39,093 billion and operating income of over US$37 billion. As reported by the US magazine Fortune in 2019, it had a turnover of US$37 billion, and could count on 130,455 employees. As of 30 September 2019, the number of registered members of Suning.com's retail platform reached 470 million users.

In February 2021, Shenzhen International and Shenzhen Kunpeng Equity Investment Management (both state-owned enterprises) invested in Suning.com at 6.92 yuan per share, for a total of approximately 14.8 billion yuan (US$2.28 billion), or 8% of the total stake. of their capital company (745 million shares) and 15% (1.397 billion shares), for a total of 23%.

In May 2021, Suning.com released its report for the first quarter of 2021. Suning.com achieved operating profit of 54.05 billion yuan (approximately over US$8 billion) and net profit attributable to shareholders of listed companies reached 456 million yuan (over US$70 million). The Retail Cloud continued to develop in the first quarter, with 584 new stores opened and the scale of sales increased by 69% year on year (the 247 stores opened in June must be added for a total of 831 new stores opened since the beginning of the year).

Two branches of the Jiangsu Province-based government agency that oversees major state-owned businesses agreed to set up a 20 billion yuan (US$3.1 billion) fund with Suning.com's parent company Suning Holdings Group. The fund would be used to invest in its best performing assets and assets, a move that should give the company more breathing room to deal with its heavy debt load.

In June 2021, Zhang Jindong's company would in fact receive 3.2 billion yuan (US$500.6 million) from a state fund as it struggled to recover from a liquidity crisis. Suning.com said 5.59% of his shares will be transferred to a fund consisting of four state-owned enterprises ultimately controlled by the Jiangsu provincial government. The shares were controlled by an affiliate of Zhang Jindong, president of Suning.com, who currently holds 19.7% of the total shares. The transfer price would be 6.12 yuan per share, 90% of Tuesday's closing price. According to the agreement, Zhang had the obligation to buy back the shares for sale by 1 April 2022, paying a consideration of 3.182 billion yuan, plus interest (equal to about 3.85% on an annual basis).

In mid June 2021, a Beijing court froze 3 billion yuan worth of shares Zhang holds in the group's retail arm Suning.com Co. for three years. With most of Zhang Jindong shares pledged as collateral for loans, that could complicate his ability to raise cash and potentially derail a state-backed rescue. Concerns over Suning's cash flow initially surged to the fore in September, when Zhang waived his right to a 20 billion yuan payment from Evergrande Group.Suning.com had stopped trading in its shares, the stock had fallen by the daily limit of 10%.

In early July 2021, it was announced that the company had reached an agreement with a group of investors, both private and government officials, who intervened on behalf of Suning.com. The transaction in question, which saw its core in the new "New Retail Innovation Fund Phase II" fund worth 8.83 billion yuan (US$1.36 billion), led by the state asset management committee of Nanjing and the government of Jiangsu province, would take over 16.96% of the company. The fund included brands such as Alibaba Group, Haier, Midea Group, TCL and Xiaomi as protagonists. With this intervention, the shares of Zhang Jindong would drop from 20.96% to 17.62%, Suning Holdings Group's stake from 3.98% to 2.73%, Suning Appliance Group from 10.68% to 1.39% and the Tibet Trust's stake fell from 3.07% to zero. After a period of suspension on the stock exchange, from 16 June to 5 July, the company's shares were up by a maximum of 10% after the dealer announced the financial transaction.

On 12 July 2021, Suning.com announced that the company's board of directors would be reorganized and that the resigned founder and chairman Zhang Jindong would take up his new position as honorary chairman of the company's board of directors. The company said Ren Jun, a board member, would perform chairman duties temporarily. Zhang Jindong would continue as legal representative until no replacement was found. For the same role there were a total of four candidates, Huang Mingduan, Xian Handi, Cao Qun and Zhang Kangyang.

Through an official note published on 29 July 2021, Suning.com announced the new composition of the company's board of directors. The new Chairman of the board was Huang Mingduan, former CEO of "Sun Art Retail Group", a supermarket chain owned by Alibaba Group, replacing Suning.com interim chairman Ren Jun. Alibaba is the company led by Jack Ma and which, as part of the "New New Retail Fund", bought shares in the subsidiary Suning in early July. Steven Zhang, president of Suning International, president of Inter, vice president of Suning Holdings Group and son of Suning's number one, Zhang Jindong, was also appointed to the board of directors, together with Huang Mingduan, Xian Handi and Cao Qun, as a non-independent director of the company's seventh board of directors. On 30 July results for the first half of 2021 was released. Total operating revenue for the half-year period was about CN¥93.657 billion.Net income attributable to shareholders of the listed company stood at about CN¥−3.19 billion.

The company was in financial trouble due to over expansion and slowdown of China's economy. According to Nikkei, the embattled Chinese retail giant Suning.com is getting a 5 billion yuan (US$685 million) lifeline from state-backed Citic Trust and China Huarong Asset Management in October 2023.

== Smart logistics ==
"Suning.com" Logistics is one of the leading retail logistics companies in China, with a delivery network covering 351 cities, 2858 districts and counties in China, with over 100,000 truck drivers working for the company. It has 5 warehouses just for regular deliveries in eastern China. The automatic warehouse in Nanjing covers more than 200,000 square meters, also the total area of the warehouse facility covers 9.64 million square meters. The size of the facilities justifies the number one position in the Chinese retail sector. Along with the size, is added the intelligent technology used by Suning. Over the years E-commerce platforms have revolutionized the way consumers shop, e-commerce has people ordering a product from the comfort of their home and quickly with home delivery. To date, with the Suning APP, it can count on over 600 million registered users.

Suning has incorporated an intelligent system into its operations, their state-of-the-art logistics facility. The entire Nanjing Logistics Center is divided into various parts intended to perform a variety of services. The storage of goods in the center is also divided into various segments that separate the products according to type and size. Use Schaefer technologies in its own intelligent logistics center. the ASRS system developed by Schaefer automation system, a German brand of automation technology in the storage sector, expands to the automated archiving and retrieval system.

The intelligent logistics centre is almost fully automated, which makes the storage process and the retrieval process for delivery faster and more reliable. The system monitoring room has a screen through which 20 people are monitoring and working to keep the whole process smoother and faster. In the hall it has feeds from multiple cameras positioned throughout the store, as well as feeds from various ASRS systems and manual worker feeds. The workers separate the products after receiving them from suppliers, storing them in small, medium and large piles and pallets. The workers have to scan the RFID code and then it goes for the final packaging before it can be delivered to the customers. Suning has a delivery of the products, purchased by the user, within twelve hours from the time of the order.

=== Automated distribution ===
During the COVID-19 pandemic in mainland China, logistics and distribution grew significantly under the catalysis of the "rule of self-isolation". According to large-scale consumption data in epidemic prevention published by Suning, the volume of orders in China for Suning Convenience Stores increased by 419.6% year on year, and the volume of "order online and collect in store "of the Food Market rose by more than 655%. In the epidemic, every residential property exercised a certain level of "block", and the traditional" contactless distribution "cannot meet the current situation. The advantages of unmanned technology are significant, such that it can improve the efficiency of the transfer between logistics warehouses and consumers. As a result, unmanned logistics can accelerate its development even after the outbreak.

Automated Unmanned Logistics describes its operational process from when packages leave the warehouse without personnel, are quickly transported overland to the distribution center in a driverless truck, then in the last mile they are delivered to their destination by an automated truck or drone. In 2018, Suning had completed the actual verification of its "Xinglong One" driverless truck. Technically, "Xinglong-1" uses advanced artificial intelligence technology that assists radar, high-precision maps, cameras and sensors, and can accurately identify obstacles up to 300 meters away in high-speed scenarios. In addition, it can also control the vehicle for emergency stops or bypass obstacles with a response speed of 25ms, and the highest speed of safe automatic driving can reach 80 km per hour. During the outbreak, Suning Logistics launched the "contactless distribution service" with 5G driverless vehicles. In collaboration with "Suning Convenience Store", "Suning Logistics" quickly set up an unmanned delivery team that guarantees instant delivery service within 3 km radius, further reducing the risk of infection between consumer and courier, further reducing the risk of infection between consumer and courier, effectively implementing the "self-isolation rule".

In 2018, Suning used autonomous delivery robots, which transport daily essentials such as drinks, fruit and snacks from the local store to the residents.

The new unmanned delivery robot called "BIU" can autonomously plan the route and avoid obstacles, deliver to the customer and return to service. The cooperation mode of "courier delivery + robot delivery to the community" opens the last 100 meters of distribution to the community during the outbreak, ensuring the safety and health of users and the home service experience.

== Mobility and transport ==
The Suning.com company, in addition to the retail sector of household appliances and electronic products, is active in the automotive sector, luxury boats and aircraft of many categories, from business jets to civil helicopters.

=== Automotive ===
The Suning.com Auto Company (Suning Auto) division opened 20 auto supermarkets in 2018 and in the following years will increase the number of auto shows in various cities, such as Xi'an, Chongqing, Chengdu and Tianjin. In addition to Chinese domestic brands, there are foreign brands in the stores, including BMW, Audi and Maserati. It also provides accessories, financial services and used cars.

=== Electric mobility ===
In 2017, Suning invested US$200 million in favor of Chinese carmaker Byton, which produces electric vehicles, which unveiled its first concept car at the Consumer Electronics Show in Las Vegas in January 2018. In August 2020, Suning entered into an agreement with the Chinese giant Nio, a Chinese car manufacturer active since 2014 based in Shanghai, specialized in the design and development of electric vehicles and which, with its own team, also participates in the world championship of Formula E. They have established a long-term partnership to strengthen strategic cooperation in various fields, including channel expansion, product sales, brand promotion, B2B cooperation, technology products and development, and create development opportunities. In the "Suning Plaza Auto", in accordance with the Baojun brand, the Baojun E100 is for sale is a two-seater electric microcar, with two doors and a hatch in the rear, and a design similar to a Smart electric drive and is the first vehicle in Baojun's electric microcar series, then there is the E200 and E300 version.

=== Car sharing ===
Suning, in a joint venture with Alibaba Group and Tencent together with automobile manufacturers Changan Automobile, Dongfeng Motor Corporation and FAW Group collaborate for a service in the ride-sharing sector, with an investment of US$1.5 billion.

== Sponsorship ==
In 2014 Suning.com sponsored the Spanish club FC Barcelona. In January 2016, one of the shareholders of Suning Commerce, Suning Appliance Group, completed the purchase of the Chinese football club Jiangsu F.C. The Chinese name of the football club was then renamed as 江苏苏宁易购队 literally Jiangsu Suning.com team. According to Suning Commerce, the company sponsored the football club CN¥123 million in 2016.

On 6 June 2016 chairman Zhang Jindong, via his own private holding company Suning Holdings Group, signed a contract to purchase the majority stake in Italian football club Inter Milan. The deal was approved by the extraordinary general meeting on 28 June 2016, which after the deal, Suning Holdings Group owned 68.55% shares. Suning.com, the online shopping website of Suning Commerce, became a sponsor of the Italian club.

On 28 December 2016 the League of Legends e-sports team T.Bear Gaming, at the time competing in the LSPL (China's secondary league), was acquired by Suning.com and re-branded as Suning Gaming. Following the re-branding, the team qualified for the League of Legends Pro League by winning the 2017 LSPL spring finals.

== Acquisitions and partnerships ==
Number	Acquisition date	Company	Business	Country	Price	Ref(s).
1	June 2009	Laox	Duty-free shop	Japan	$121,000,000	
2	December 2009	Citicall	Consumer Electronics	Hong Kong	HK$215,000,000	
3	September 2012	Redbaby	E-commerce	China	$66,000,000	
4	October 2013	PPTV	Streaming Media	China	$250,000,000	
5	January 2014	manzuo.com	E-commerce	China	$10,000,000	
6	December 2014	Allyes	Marketing communications	China	$15,000,000	
7	April 2016	Nubia	Mobile phones	China	RMB283,700,000	
8	June 2016	Taobao	E-commerce	China	$2.3×10^{9}	
9	August 2017	China United Network Communications	Telecommunications	China		
10	February 2019	Carrefour China	Retail	China	€620,000,000	
11	June 2019	Wanda Group	Retail commercial complex	China	$1.18×10^{9}	

== Shareholders ==
After the deal in July 2021, Suning's honorary chair, Zhang Jindong, Suning Holdings Group and Suning Appliance Group would hold a 21.74% in Suning.com, while Alibaba's Taobao would remain the retailer's second-largest shareholder with a 19.99 percent stake. The Suning-Taobao alliance was announced in 2015. The consortium would become the third largest shareholder with a 16.96-percent stake.

Rank	Name	Chinese name	Percentage	Footnotes
1	Taobao (China) Software	淘宝(中国)软件	19.99%	subsidiary of listed company Alibaba Group
2	Zhang Jindong	张近东	17.62%	founder and honorary of Suning.com; owned directly and via Suning Holdings Group
3	New Retail Innovation Fund	新零售創新基金	16.96%	the fund includes brands such as Alibaba Group, Haier, Midea Group, TCL and Xiaomi as protagonists
4	Suning Holdings Group	苏宁控股集团有限公司	2.73%	the company shared the same founder Zhang Jindong
5	Suning Appliance Group	苏宁电器集团	1.39%	owned directly and via private equity fund; Zhang partially owned the company
Subtotal			58.69%	
6	Others shareholders	其他股東	41.31%	

== Board of directors ==
Board of Directors in charge as of 2021:

- Xiao Ling Wang - Chairman-Supervisory board
- Mingduan Huang - Chairman
- Jun Ren - President & Director
- Jian Ying Li - Member-Supervisory board
- Zhi Song Hua - Member-Supervisory board
- Xian Ming Fang - Independent director
- Shi Ping Liu - Independent director
- Qun Cao - Non-independent director
- Kangyang Zhang - Director
- Handi Xian - Director

== Financial data ==
Financial data in CN¥
Year	2015	2016	2017	2018	2019	2020
Revenue	135,547,630,000	148,585,330,000	187,927,764,000	244,956,573,000	269,228,900,000	252,295,666,000
Net Income	872,500,000	704,410,000	4,212,516,000	13,327,559,000	9,842,955,000	-4,274,696,000
Assets	88,075,660,000	137,167,250,000	157,276,688,000	199,467,202,000	236,855,045,000	212,075,200,000
Equity	30,482,550,000	65,709,670,000	83,627,655,000	88,210,799,000	87,144,813,000	76,831,803,000

== Gallery ==
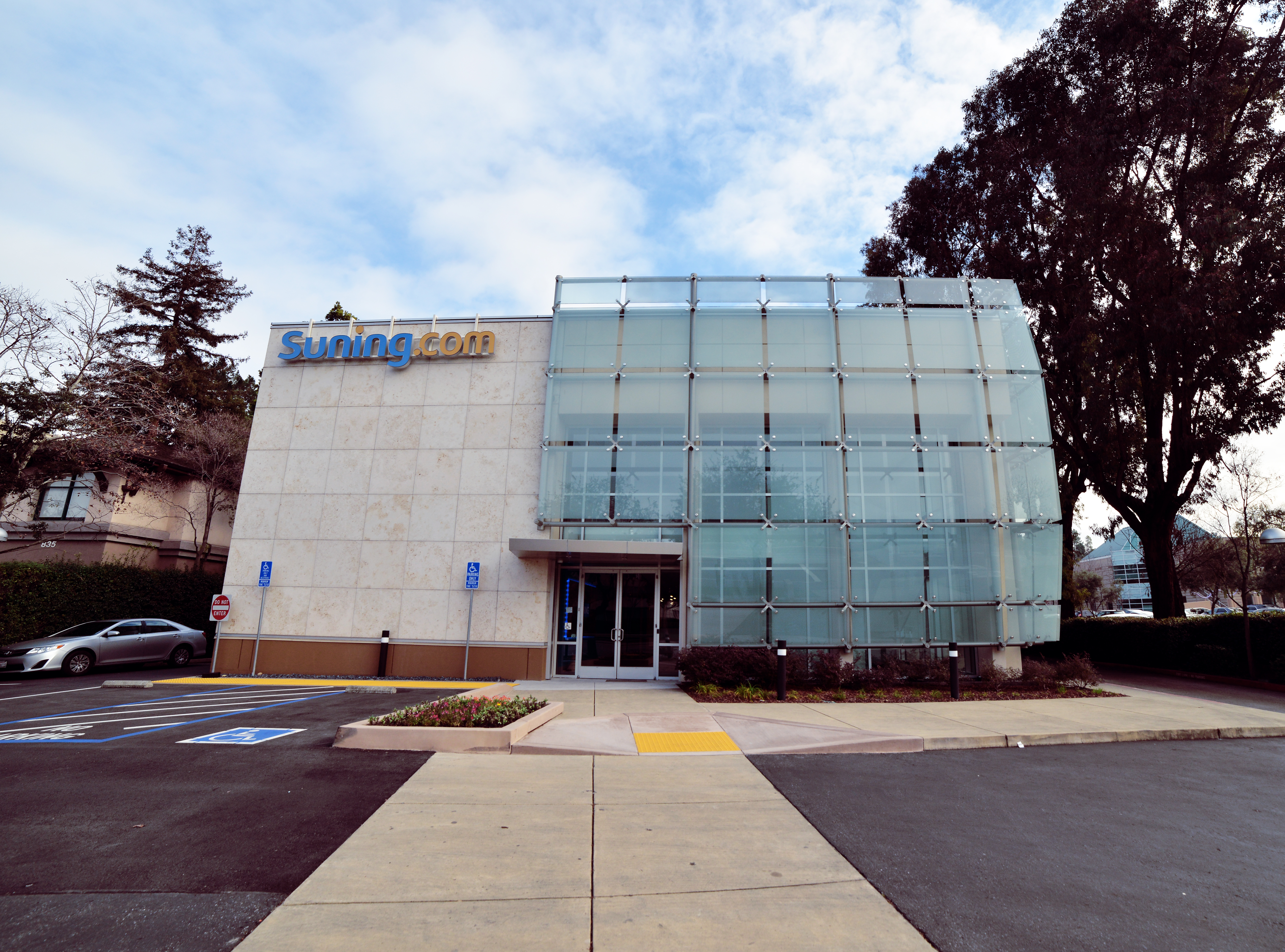
Suning US R&D Center and Silicon Valley Research Institute in Palo Alto

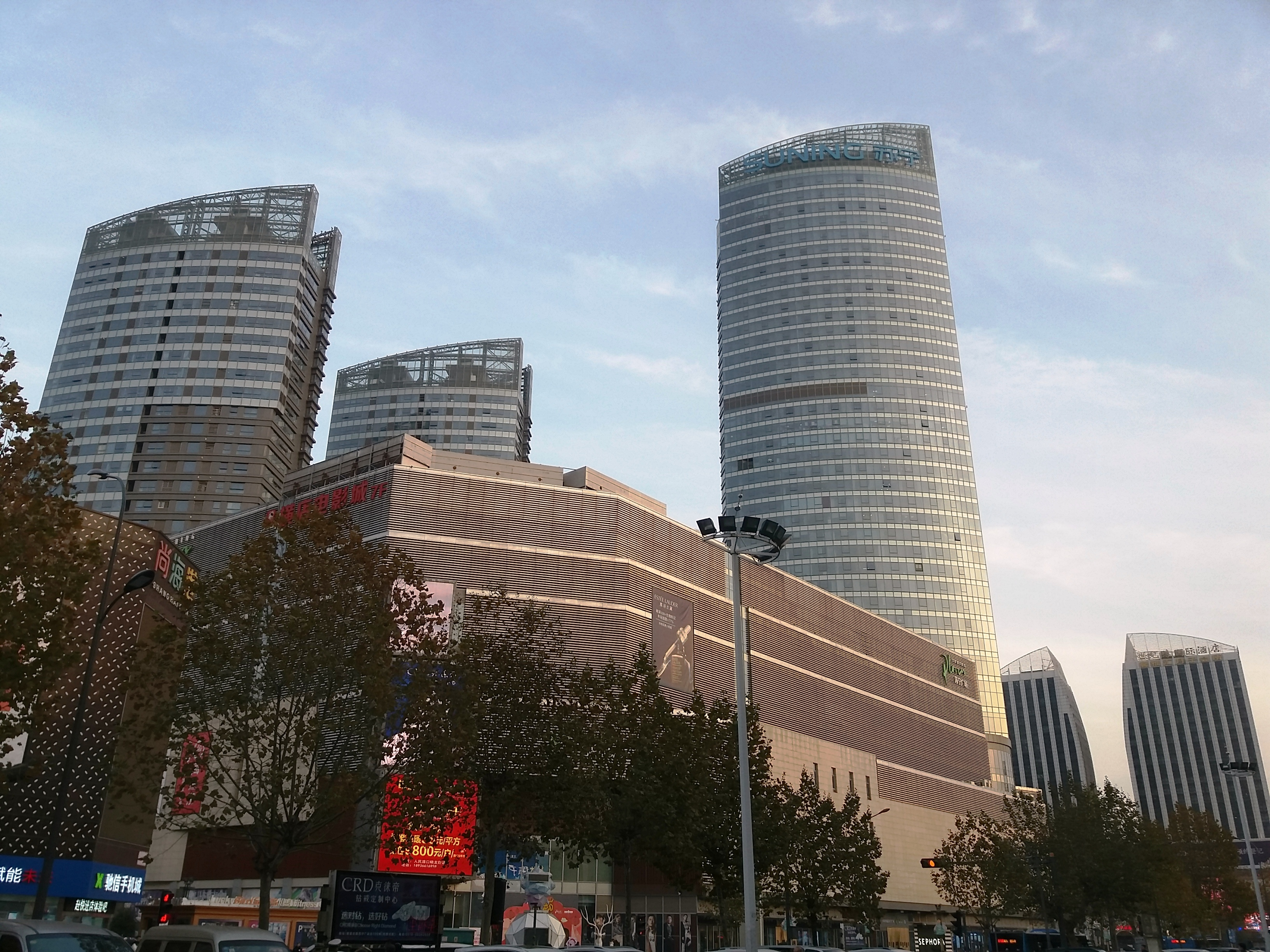
The "Suning Square" shopping complex in Lianyungang

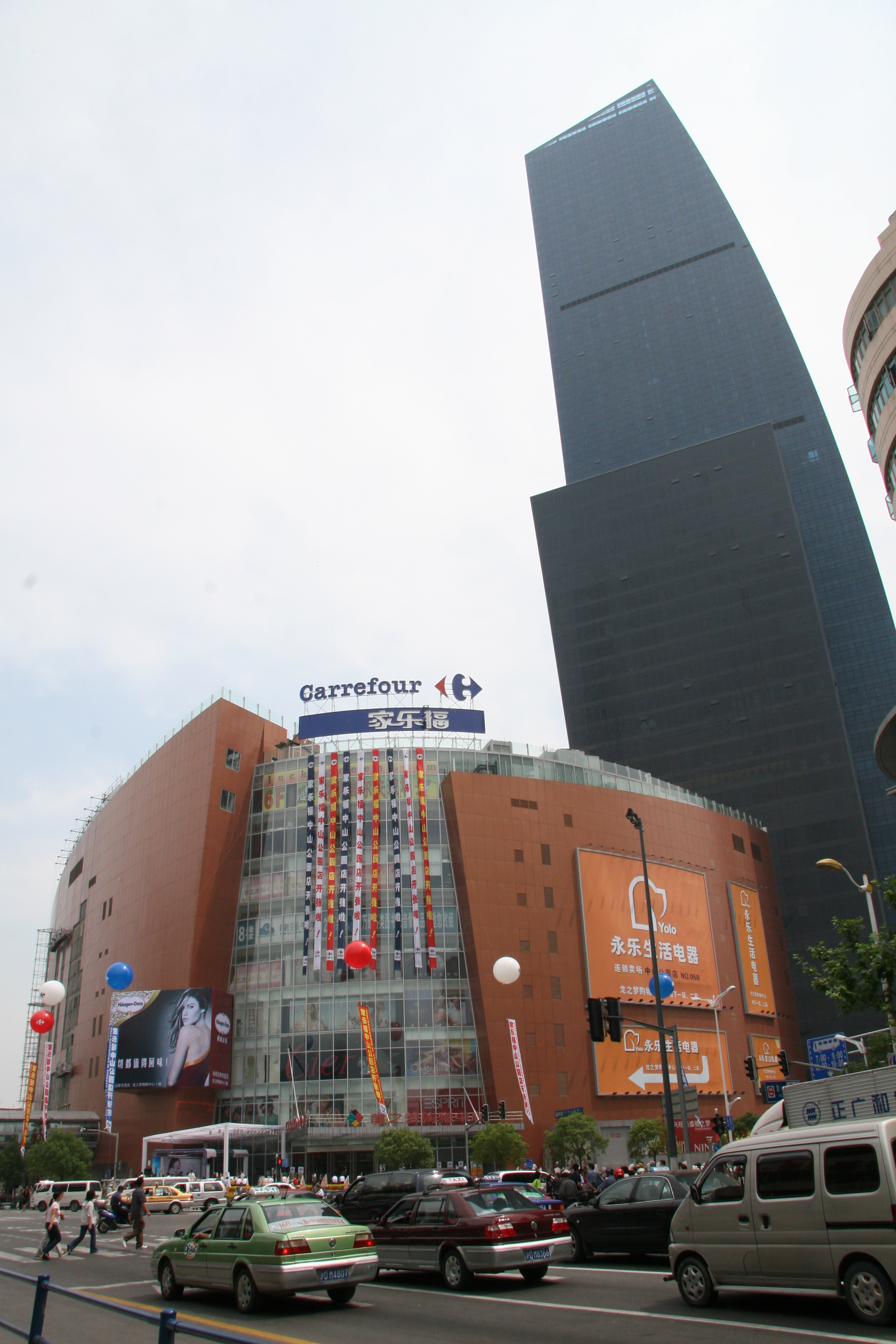
A Carrefour supermarket in Shanghai

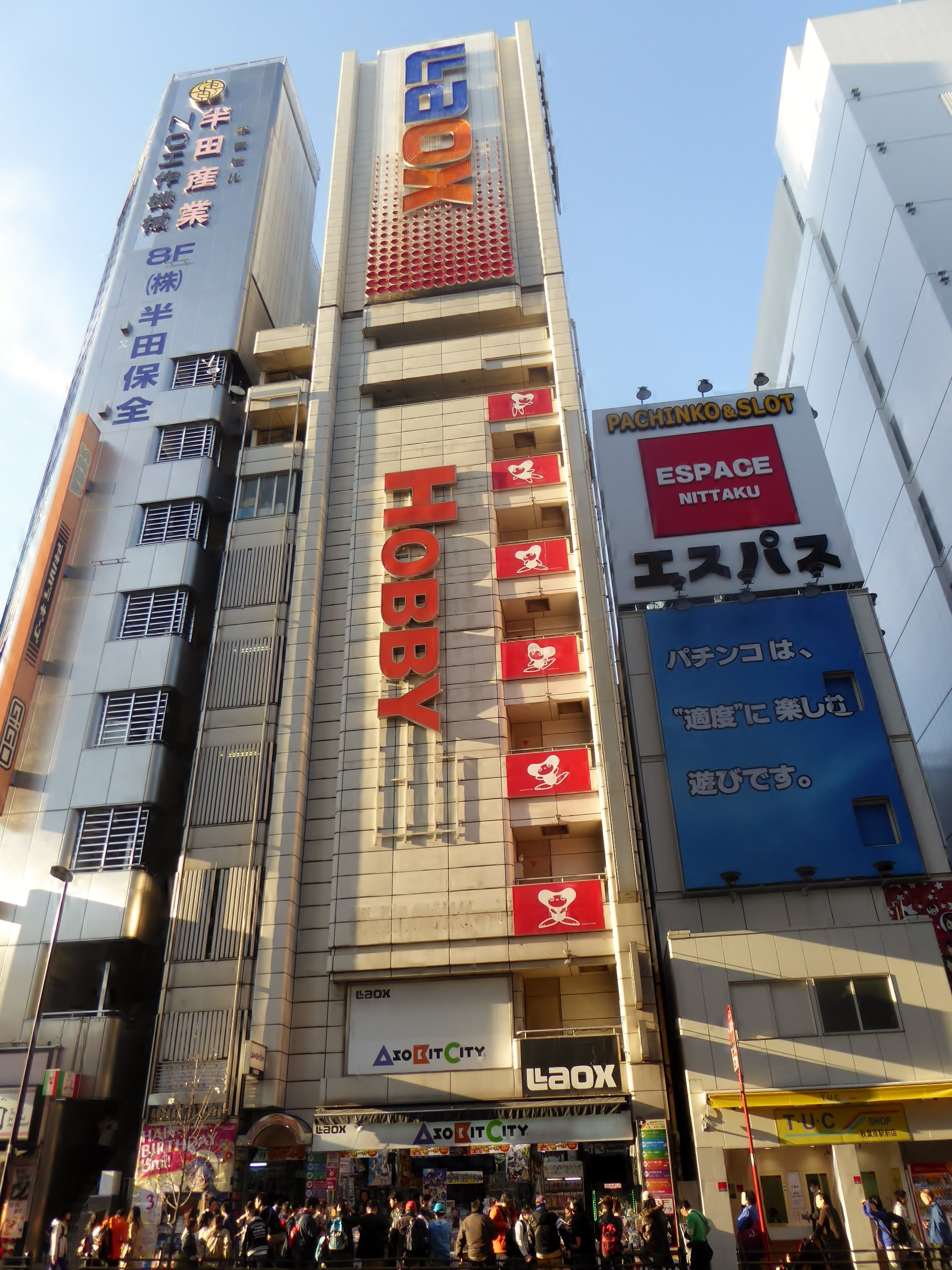
A Laox center in Akihabara

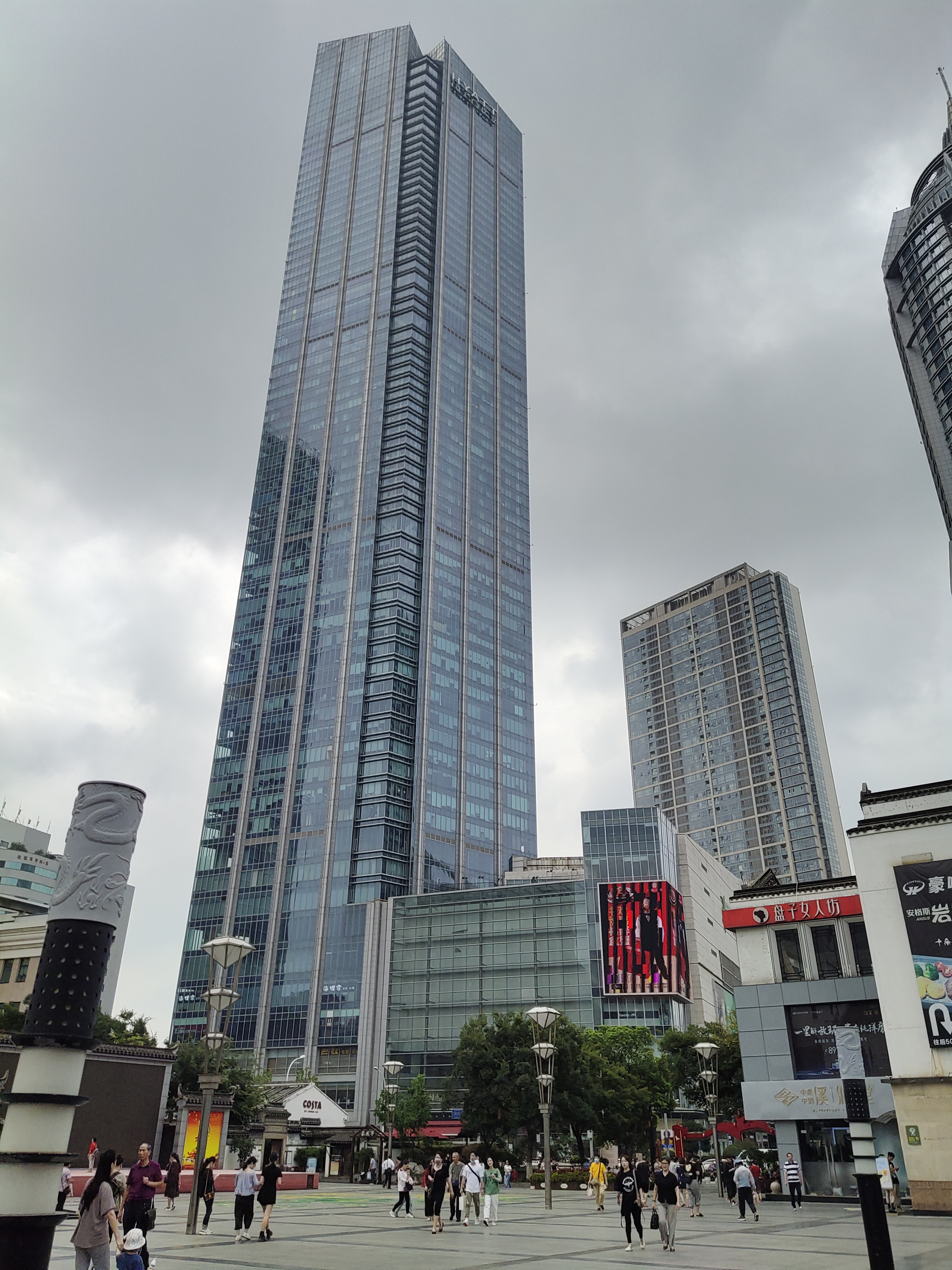
The "Wuxi Suning Plaza Complex", located in the city of Wuxi.

== See also ==
- Taobao (China) Software, second largest shareholder of Suning.com Co., Ltd.
- Suning Holdings Group, sister company, minority shareholder of Suning.com Co., Ltd.
- Suning Appliance Group, minority shareholder of Suning.com Co., Ltd.
