= Redshift (disambiguation) =

Redshift is a phenomenon in physics, especially astrophysics.

Redshift or red shift may also refer to:

== Literature ==
- Red Shift (novel), a 1973 novel by Alan Garner
- Red Shift (comics), a character in the Marvel Comics universe

== Music ==
- Redshift (group), an English electronic music group
- The Redshift, an album by Omnium Gatherum
- "Redshift" (Enter Shikari song)

== Television ==
- "Red Shift", an adaptation of the Garner novel (above) in the BBC Play for Today anthology series

== Science and technology ==
- Red Shift Ltd, a video game publisher
- Amazon Redshift, a cloud data warehouse service
- Redshift (renderer), a rendering engine (GPU-accelerated) for Cinema 4D
- Redshift (software), a computer display utility program
- RedShift (astronomy software), a software CD-ROM from Maris Technologies
- Redshift (theory), an economic theory about information technology markets
