= British Summer Time =

Identifier for a time offset from UTC of +1

- Time zone

UTC offset
- BST: UTC+01:00

Current time
- :: GMT [refresh]

Observance of DST
- This time zone is only used for DST. For the rest of the year, GMT is used.

Time in Europe: Light Blue / Western European Time / Greenwich Mean Time (UTC); Blue / Western European Time / Greenwich Mean Time (UTC); Blue / Western European Summer Time / British Summer Time / Irish Standard Time (UTC+1); Red / Central European Time (UTC+1); Red / Central European Summer Time (UTC+2); Yellow / Eastern European Time / Kaliningrad Time (UTC+2); Ochre / Eastern European Time (UTC+2); Ochre / Eastern European Summer Time (UTC+3); Green / Moscow Time / Turkey Time (UTC+3); Turquoise / Armenia Time / Azerbaijan Time / Georgia Time / Samara Time (UTC+4); ▉▉▉▉ Pale hues: Standard time observed all year ▉▉▉ Dark hues: Daylight saving time

During British Summer Time (BST), civil time in the United Kingdom is advanced one hour forward of Greenwich Mean Time (GMT), in effect changing the time zone from UTC+00:00 to UTC+01:00, so that mornings have one hour less daylight, and evenings one hour more.

BST begins at 01:00 GMT every year on the last Sunday of March and ends at 02:00 BST on the last Sunday of October. The starting and finishing times of daylight saving were aligned across the European Union on 22 October 1995, and the UK retained this alignment after it left the EU; both BST and Central European Summer Time begin and end on the same Sundays at 02:00 Central European Time, 01:00 GMT. Between 1972 and 1995, the BST period was defined as "beginning at two o'clock, Greenwich mean time, in the morning of the day after the third Saturday in March or, if that day is Easter Day, the day after the second Saturday in March, and ending at two o'clock, Greenwich mean time, in the morning of the day after the fourth Saturday in October."

== Summer Time ==
The following table lists recent-past and near-future start and end dates of British Summer Time:

Year	Start	End
2023	26 March	29 October
2024	31 March	27 October
2025	30 March	26 October
2026	29 March	25 October
2027	28 March	31 October
2028	26 March	29 October
2029	25 March	28 October

== Instigation and early years ==
=== Early history ===
British Summer Time was first established by the Summer Time Act 1916, after a campaign by builder William Willett who conceived the idea and published a proposal in July 1907 in a pamphlet titled "Waste of Daylight". His original proposal was to move the clocks forward by 80 minutes, in 20-minute weekly steps on Sundays in April and by the reverse procedure in September. In 1916, BST began on 21 May and ended on 1 October. Willett never lived to see his idea implemented, having died in early 1915.

== Periods of deviation ==
In the summers of 1941 to 1945, during the Second World War, Britain was two hours ahead of GMT and operating on British Double Summer Time (BDST). To bring this about, the clocks were not put back by an hour at the end of summer in 1940 (BST having started early, on 25 February 1940). In subsequent years, clocks continued to be advanced by one hour each spring (to BDST) and put back by an hour each autumn (to BST). On 15 July 1945, the clocks were put back by an hour, so BDST reverted to BST; the clocks were put back by an additional hour on 7 October 1945, so BST reverted to GMT for the winter of 1945.

In 1946, BST operated as normal (from April to October) but in 1947, for a single year, BDST was re-introduced with effect from 13 April (BST having started on 16 March). After four months of BDST the clocks were put back by an hour on 10 August (to BST) and by another hour on 2 November (to GMT).

An inquiry during the winter of 1959–60, in which 180 national organisations were consulted, revealed a slight preference for a change to all-year GMT+1, but instead the length of summer time was extended as a trial. A further inquiry during 1966–1967 led the government of Harold Wilson to introduce the British Standard Time experiment, with Britain remaining on GMT+1 throughout the year. This took place between 27 October 1968 and 31 October 1971, when there was a reversion to the previous arrangement.

Analysis of accident data for the first two years of the experiment, published by HMSO in October 1970, indicated that while there had been an increase in casualties in the morning, there had been a substantially greater decrease in casualties in the evening, with a total of around 2,700 fewer people killed and seriously injured on the roads during the first two winters of the experiment, at a time when about 1,000 people a day were killed or injured on the roads. However, the period coincided with the introduction of drink/drive legislation; the estimates were later modified downwards in 1989.

The trial was the subject of a House of Commons debate on 2 December 1970 when, on a free vote, the House of Commons voted by 366 to 81 votes to end the experiment.

== Debates on reform ==
Campaigners, including the Royal Society for the Prevention of Accidents (RoSPA) and environmental campaigners Possible, have made recommendations that British Summer Time be maintained during the winter months, and that a "double summertime" be applied to the current British Summer Time period, putting the UK one hour ahead of GMT during winter, and two hours ahead during summer. This proposal is referred to as "Single/Double Summer Time" (SDST), and would effectively mean the UK adopting the same time zone as European countries such as France, Germany, and mainland Spain (Central European Time and Central European Summer Time).

RoSPA has suggested that this would reduce the number of accidents over this period as a result of the lighter evenings. RoSPA have called for the 1968–71 trial to be repeated with modern evaluation methods. A campaign in 2010, "Lighter Later", in addition to publicising the risk reductions described above, also highlighted the potential energy benefits of Single/Double Summer Time, arguing that the change could "save almost 500,000 tonnes of CO_{2} each year, equivalent to taking 185,000 cars off the road permanently". In 2015 road safety campaigner Paul A. Singh and former police Chief Constable Keith Hellawell campaigned for the cessation of British Summer Time after research into Department for Transport data showed that it could lead to a reduction in pedestrian road accidents especially for children.

These proposals are opposed by some farmers and other outdoor workers and by many residents of Scotland and Northern Ireland, as it would mean that in much of Scotland, especially in the north, and Northern Ireland the winter sunrise would not occur until 10:00 or even later. However, in March 2010, the National Farmers' Union indicated that it was not against Single/Double Summer Time, with many farmers expressing a preference for the change. Other opponents of daylight saving measures say that darker mornings, especially in Scotland, could affect children going to school and people travelling to work.

A YouGov poll taken in March 2015 revealed that 40 per cent of the people surveyed would prefer an end to the practice of changing the clocks, while 33 per cent wanted to keep it (the rest were indifferent or not sure). In Scotland, opinion was reversed with 31 and 41 per cent respectively.

== Current statute and parliamentary attempts at change ==
The current arrangement is now defined by the Summer Time Order 2002 which defines BST as "the period beginning at one o'clock, Greenwich mean time, in the morning of the last Sunday in March and ending at one o'clock, Greenwich mean time, in the morning of the last Sunday in October." This period was stipulated by a directive (2000/84/EC) of the European Parliament which required European countries to implement a common summer time (as originally introduced in 1997, in Directive 97/44/EC).

Debate emerges most years over the applicability of BST, and the issue is the subject of parliamentary debate. In 2004, English MP Nigel Beard tabled a Private Member's Bill in the House of Commons proposing that England and Wales should be able to determine their own time independently of Scotland and Northern Ireland.

In 2005, Lord Tanlaw introduced the Lighter Evenings (Experiment) Bill into the House of Lords, which would advance winter and summer time by one hour for a three-year trial period at the discretion of "devolved bodies", allowing Scotland and Northern Ireland the option not to take part. The proposal was opposed by the government. The bill received its second reading on 24 March 2006; however, it did not pass into law. The Local Government Association has also called for such a trial.

=== Daylight Saving Bill 2010–12 ===
The Daylight Saving Bill 2010–12, a private member's bill by Conservative backbench MP Rebecca Harris, would have required the government to conduct an analysis of the potential costs and benefits of advancing time by one hour for all, or part of, the year. If such an analysis were to find that a clock change would benefit the UK, the bill required that the government should then initiate a trial clock change to determine the full effects.

In 2010, Prime Minister David Cameron stated he would seriously consider proposals in the bill. The bill was likely only to be passed with government support. Despite initial opposition in Scotland to the move, Cameron stated his preference was for the change to apply across the United Kingdom, stating "We are a United Kingdom. I want us to have a united time zone." A survey in late October 2010 of about 3,000 people for British energy firm npower suggested that a narrow majority of Scots may be in favour of this change, though the Scottish Government remained opposed.

The bill was debated again in Parliament in November 2011 and sent to committee in December 2011. In January 2012, the bill was again debated on the floor of the House of Commons where it was filibustered out of Parliament by opponents. Angus MacNeil, MP for Na h-Eileanan an Iar, argued that it would adversely affect the population of Northern Scotland, while Jacob Rees-Mogg, MP for North East Somerset, tried to introduce an amendment to give Somerset its own time zone, 15 minutes behind London, in order to highlight what he saw as the absurdities of the bill. With all its allocated time used up, the bill could proceed no further through Parliament.

=== European reform from 2021 ===
In 2018, after conducting a public survey, the European Commission proposed to put an end to seasonal clock changes in the European Union with effect from 2019. The European Parliament supported this proposal; however, as of March 2021, the proposal was still awaiting approval from the Council of the European Union, without which it will not come into force. If the proposal is ultimately approved, implementation will be deferred. Each member state will choose whether to remain on its current summer time, in which case the last transition would be on the last Sunday of March in the year of implementation, or its current winter time, which would take permanent effect from the last Sunday of October. Although the United Kingdom left the EU before any new directive became effective, EU rules continued to apply during the transition period. Thereafter, the UK can choose to make its own arrangements. If the UK were thus to continue observing summer and winter time, Northern Ireland would have a one-hour time difference for half the year either with the Republic of Ireland or with the rest of the UK. As of September 2018, the UK Government had "no plans" to end daylight saving.

In July 2019, the House of Lords EU Internal Market Sub-Committee launched a new inquiry into the implications for the UK of the European changes, to "explore what preparations the Government needs to make and what factors should inform the UK's response."

== See also ==
- Daylight saving time by country
- Greenwich Mean Time
- Lighting-up time
- Time in the Republic of Ireland
- Western European Summer Time
