= Redshift (software) =

Computer display color temperature auto-adjuster

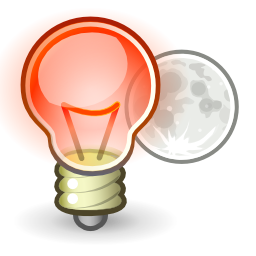

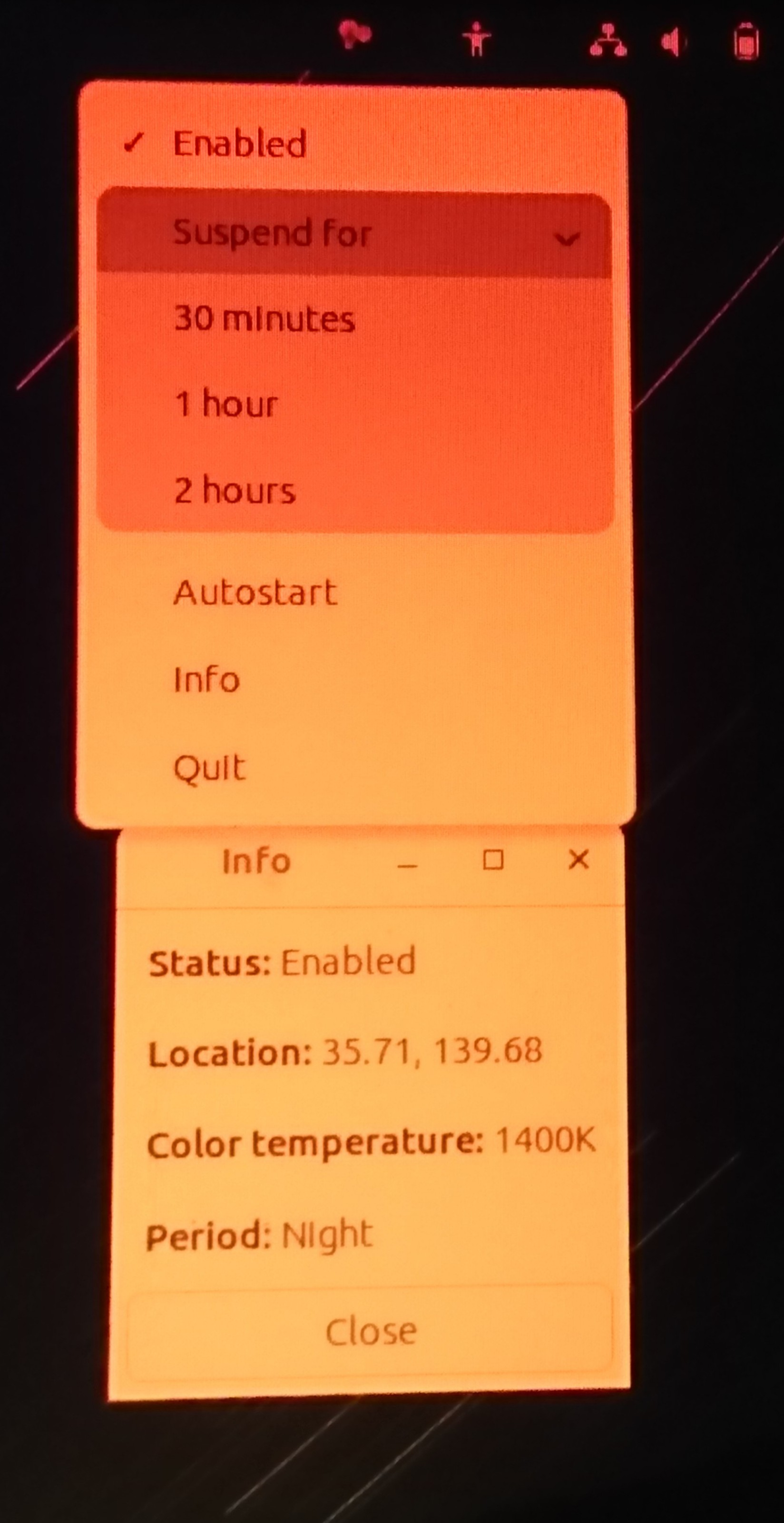
- Redshift 1.12 activated on Ubuntu 23.04 Lunar Lobster
- Developer: Jon Lund Steffensen
- Release: 4 November 2009; 16 years ago
- Final release: 1.12 / 20 May 2018; 8 years ago
- Written in: C, Python
- Operating system: BSD, Linux, Windows
- Successor: gammastep
- Available in: English
- License: GPLv3
- Website: http://jonls.dk/redshift/
- Repository: github.com/jonls/redshift

Redshift is an application that adjusts the computer display's color temperature based upon the time of day. The program is free software and is intended to reduce eye strain, as well as insomnia (see Sleep § Circadian clock and Phase response curve § Light).

Redshift transitions the computer display's color temperature evenly between daytime and night temperatures to allow the user's eyes to slowly adapt. At night, the color temperature is low, typically 3000–4000 K and preferably matching the room's lighting temperature. Typical color temperature during the daytime is 5500–6500 K.

== Features ==
Redshift is primarily distributed for and used on the Linux operating system.

Redshift can be used to set a single color temperature and brightness ("one-shot mode") or can adjust the temperature and brightness continuously to follow the Sun's elevation, in which case it will transition to the night color temperature settings near twilight. The temperature and brightness settings for daytime and night can be user-configured.

To determine the Sun's elevation, the software requires the user's location in form of latitude and longitude.

On Linux and BSD operating systems, Redshift supports multiple monitors through the X extensions RandR (preferred) or VidMode, or through the Direct Rendering Manager. Because Redshift can only be configured to use the same gamma correction on all monitors it controls, it is usually desirable to run one instance of the program per monitor.

=== Interfaces ===
Redshift originally had only a command-line interface, but now has graphical user interfaces (GUIs) that support most Linux desktop environments. Those GUIs include redshift-gtk, redshift-plasmoid, and nightshift.

redshift-gtk is included in Redshift's source tree. In addition to a windowed interface, it provides a tray status icon that can enable or disable Redshift or adjust the screen's color temperature automatically.

Redshift can be opened with the use of terminal, panel launchers or startup commands: the command redshift -O #TEMP (#TEMP being the color temperature in kelvins, from 1000 to 25000) will set the temperature, and the command redshift -x to exit Redshift.

A simple script can be made and called upon to set the color temperature manually via a shortcut or panel launcher:

1. Create a new file and copy in the following:
  #!/bin/bash
shouldloop=true;
while $shouldloop; do
    read -p "What temp would you like? 1000-25000K: " scale

    if "$scale" -ge 1000 && "$scale" -le 25000; then
        redshift -O $scale
        shouldloop=false;
    elif $scale = "x"; then
        exit
    elif $scale = "X"; then
        exit
    else
        echo "Invalid value or outside range. x to exit..."
    fi
done
2. Save the file in your /home/$user directory.
3. Change the properties of the file so it can be executed (using chmod or context menu permissions).
4. Create a new launcher ("set temp") referring to the file you have named above and select "Open in Terminal".
5. Create a new launcher ("exit redshift") with the command redshift -x (no need to open this in terminal).
6. Use the launcher to set temperature or exit Redshift.

== Forks ==
Since 14 Jun 2020, Redshift development has been abandoned.

Since 27 August 2023, Debian users are recommended to use gammastep, a Redshift fork, instead.

== Reviews ==
Redshift has been positively reviewed by Linux users, who note that Redshift has some installation and user interface advantages compared to the f.lux Linux port xflux. However, f.lux's systems have since been updated to enhance its dimmed display.

Ubuntu MATE provides Redshift installed by default since their 17.10 release.

Linux Mint Cinnamon provides Redshift installed by default since their 18.3 release. Since development of Redshift has been abandoned, Linux Mint is looking for a replacement.

== See also ==
- F.lux
- Night Shift (software) – a feature of macOS and iOS that provides a similar function
