= F.lux =

Program to adjust a display to reduce eye strain

f.lux

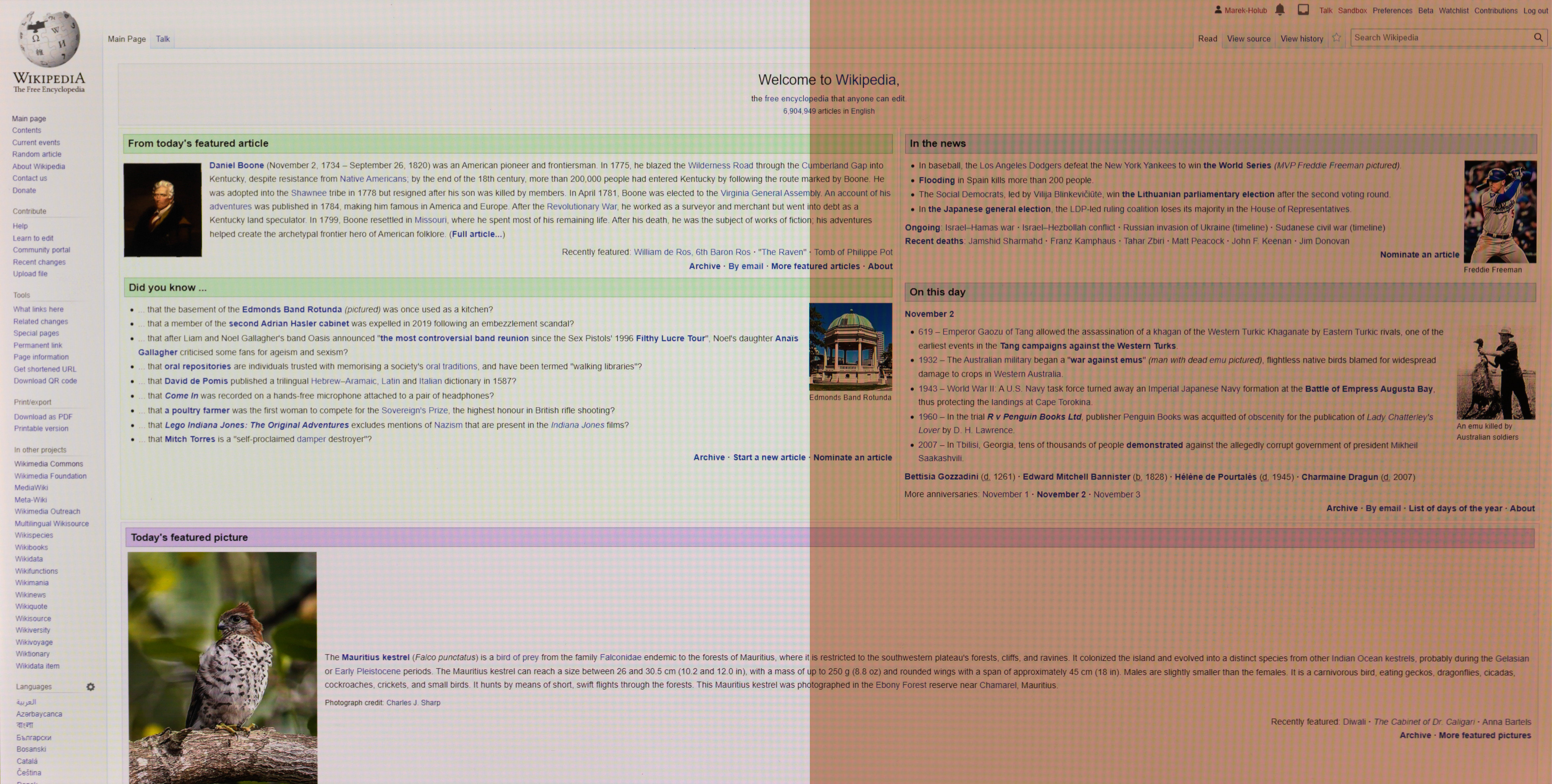
- Two photos of a screen stitched together, f.lux disabled (on the left), and f.lux's default settings (on the right)
- Original authors: Michael Herf, Lorna Herf
- Developer: F.lux Software LLC
- Release: February 2009; 17 years ago
- Stable release: Windows: v4.141 macOS: 41.5 iOS: 0.9986
- Operating system: Windows, macOS, Linux, Android, iOS
- Available in: English
- License: Freeware
- Website: justgetflux.com

f.lux (pronounced "flux") is a cross-platform computer program that adjusts a display's color temperature according to location and time of day, offering functional respite for the eyes. The program is designed to reduce eye strain during night-time use, helping to reduce disruption of sleep patterns.

== Functionality ==
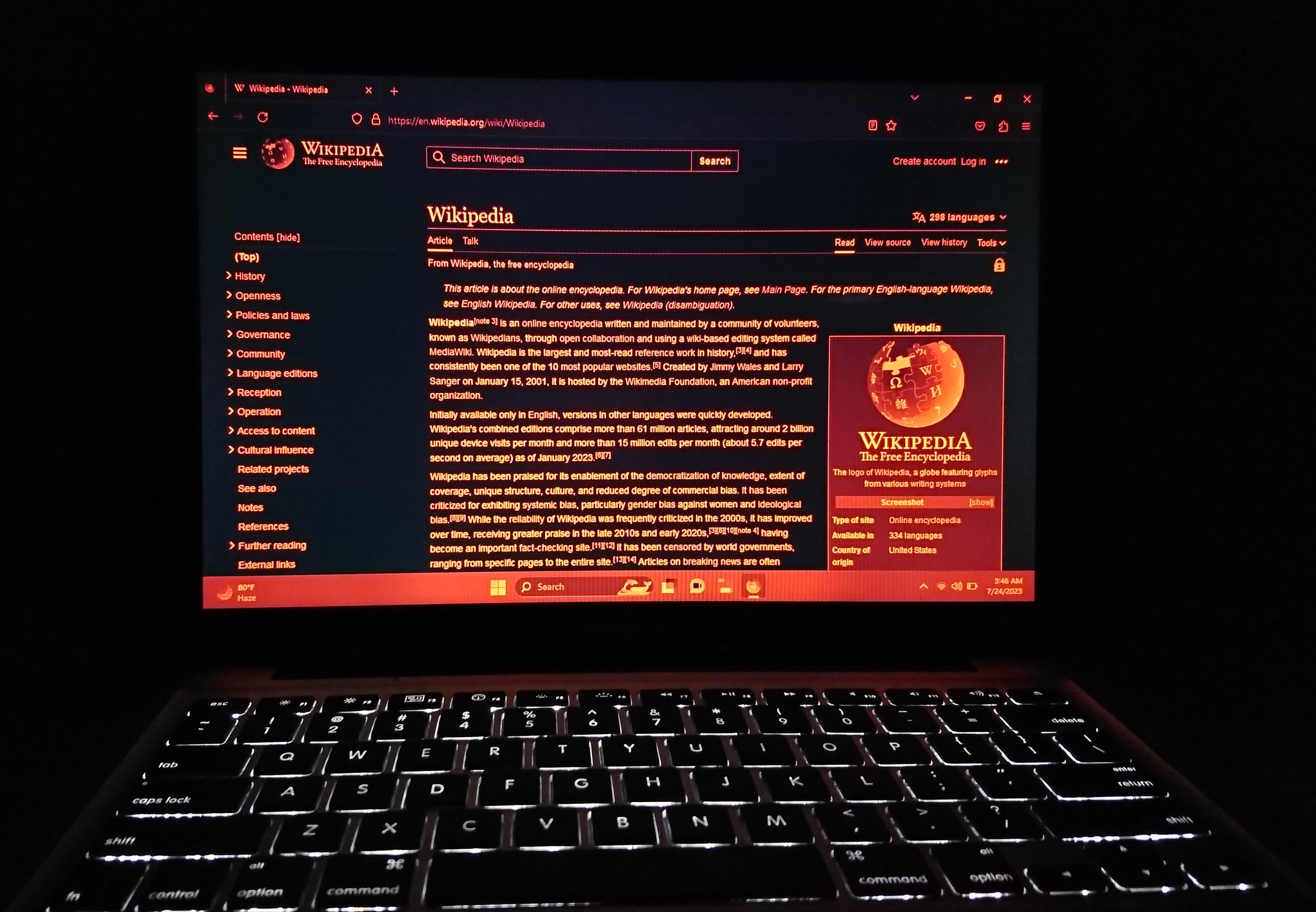
A screen in F.lux's "darkroom mode"

On installation, the user can choose a location based on geographic coordinates, a ZIP code, or the name of a location. The program then automatically calibrates the device display's color temperature to account for time of day, based on sunrise and sunset at the chosen location. At sunset, it will gradually change the color temperature to a warmer color and restore the original color at sunrise.

f.lux offers a variety of color profiles and pre-defined temperature values, modifying program behaviour for specific programs or activities; including a mode for film watching, decreasing red tinge (for 2.5 hours), and a darkroom mode that does not affect night-adapted vision. Times can be inverted on f.lux for PC to provide warm lighting during the daytime (for people who work at night). The program can control Philips Hue LED lighting, so that the color temperature of house lights follows f.lux's settings.

== Platforms ==
The program is available for Microsoft Windows, macOS and Linux. It is also available for Apple iOS devices, although it requires the device to be jailbroken. Apple has not allowed the application in its App Store due to its use of restricted developer tools. The developer briefly hosted an Xcode project on GitHub, allowing iOS 9 users to sideload the application onto their devices, but retracted it at the request of Apple. Following Apple's announcement of a similar function, called Night Shift, in iOS 9.3, the developer called upon Apple to provide developer tools and to allow their application into the App Store. A preview version for Google's Android system is available.

== Efficacy ==
Reducing exposure to bright (1000 lux) blue lights at night time was linked to increased melatonin secretion in a 1996 study but a 2018 study showed that changing the spectral composition of self-luminous displays without changing their brightness settings may be insufficient for preventing impacts on melatonin suppression.

f.lux proponents hypothesize that altering the color temperature of a display to reduce the prominence of white–blue light at night will improve the effectiveness of sleep. Although the developer provides a list of relevant research on their website, the program itself has not been scientifically tested to determine its efficacy, and the equivalent Apple program, Night Shift, was shown to have no effect on sleep outcomes (sleep latency, duration, efficiency and wake after sleep onset) in a 2021 study on 167 college undergraduates. f.lux has been widely and positively reviewed by technology journalists, bloggers, and users.

== See also ==
- Electronic media and sleep
- Purkinje effect § Use of red lights
- Redshift (software)
- Light-on-dark color scheme
