= Night Shift (software) =

iOS and macOS software feature

Night Shift is a built in software feature of iOS and macOS. It was introduced in 2016–2017 into iOS in iOS 9.3 and into macOS in macOS Sierra 10.12.4. The feature changes the color temperature of the display towards the warmer part of the color spectrum that reduces some of the blue light from the screen. Apple claims that the feature may help users have a better night's sleep by filtering blue wavelengths from the display, which suppress melatonin biosynthesis. The feature is similar to the functionality f.lux provides.

== Effectiveness ==
Changing the color temperature of the display from blue towards yellow (without dimming the screen) was shown to have no effect on sleep outcomes (sleep latency, duration, efficiency and wake after sleep onset) in a 2021 study on 167 college undergraduates and to be insufficient for preventing the impact on melatonin suppression. In mice, yellow colors disrupted the mouse body clock more than equally bright blue colors.

== Compatibility ==
The Night Shift feature is compatible with all 64-bit iOS devices running on iOS 9.3 and above and Macs from 2012 and later running on macOS Sierra 10.12.4 and above.

== Functionality ==
The feature can be turned on in Settings (in iOS) and in System Preferences (in macOS) and can be toggled on or off manually in the Notification Center (in macOS) or in the Control Center (in iOS). The feature can be enabled or disabled with Siri in iOS and macOS. The feature can set so it is enabled at sunset and turn off at sunrise (the default) or turned on and off on a custom schedule. The feature when set to enable at sunset and disable at sunrise relies on the user's approximate location to determine the time of sunset and sunrise. The user can also customize the intensity of Night Shift in Settings (iOS) or System Preferences (macOS).

== See also ==
- Electronic media and sleep
- f.lux
- Redshift (software)
- Night Light, a feature of the Creator's Update of Windows 10
- Light-on-dark color scheme
- True Tone (iPhone)
