= Screen time =

Time spent on any device with a screen

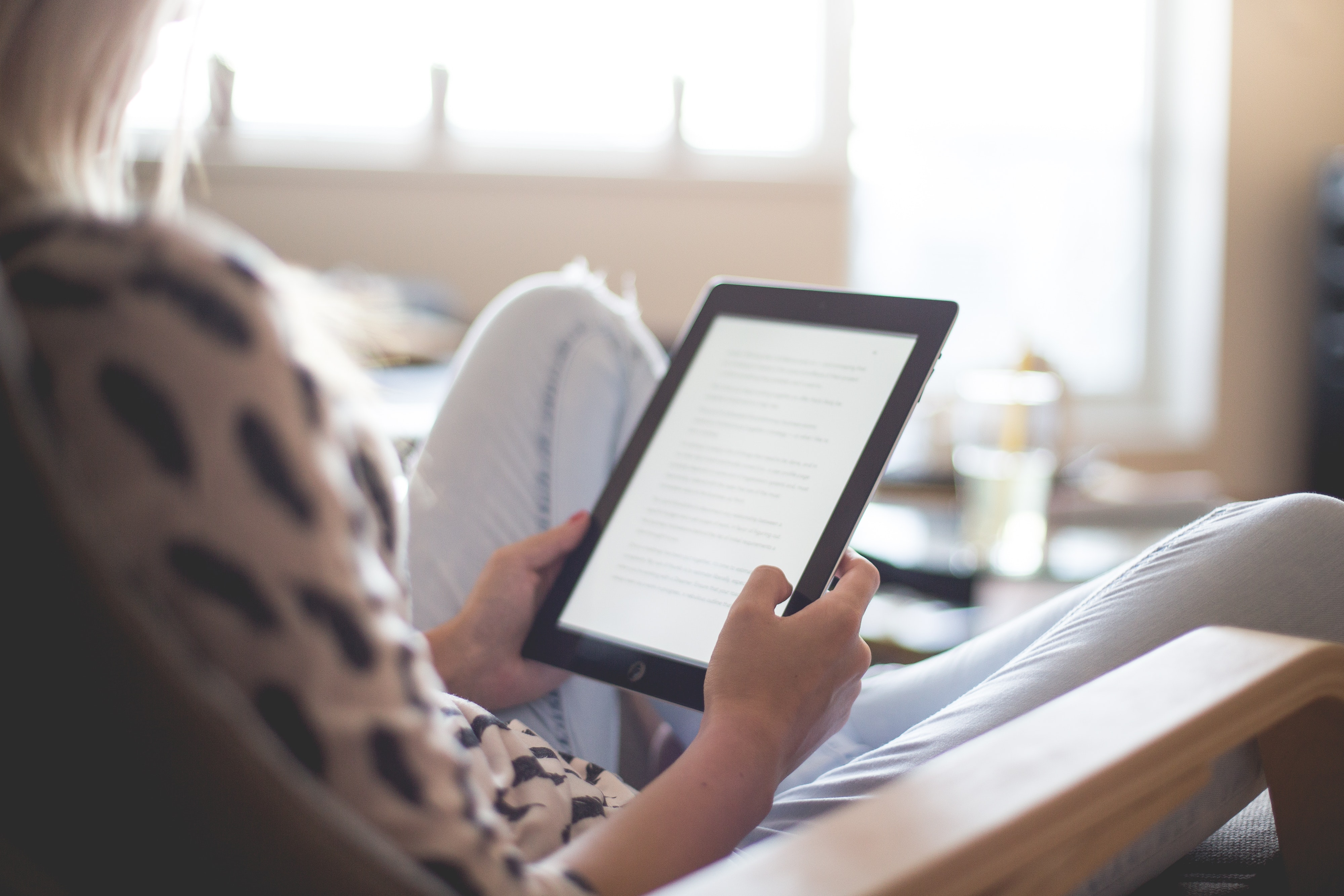
A person reading an ebook on an Apple iPad tablet

Screen time is the amount of hours spent using an electronic device with a display screen emitting blue light, such as a smartphone, computer, television, video game console, or tablet. The concept is under significant research with related concepts in digital media use and mental health. Screen time is correlated with mental and physical harm in child development. The positive or negative health effects of screen time on a particular individual are influenced by levels and content of exposure. Screen time is known to increase dopamine and mess with the circadian rhythm. To prevent harmful excesses of screen time, some governments have placed regulations on usage.

== History ==
An early researcher who worked on the first electronic computer at Princeton in the 1950s alongside John von Neumann, "insisted on using punched cards, even when everybody had computer screens." Amongst the reasons that he gave for this, we find the statement that, "when you sit in front of a screen your ability to think clearly declines because you're distracted by irrelevancies." This early intuition has since been verified by dozens of studies.

=== Statistics ===
The first electronic screen was the cathode ray tube (CRT), which was invented in 1922. CRTs were the most popular choice for display screens until the rise of liquid crystal displays (LCDs) in the early 2000s. Screens are now an essential part of entertainment, advertising, and information technologies.

Since their popularization in 2007, smartphones have become ubiquitous in daily life. In 2023, 85% of American adults reported owning a smartphone. An American survey in 2016 found a median of 3.7 minutes per hour screen use per citizen. All forms of screens are frequently used by children and teens. Nationally representative data of children and teens in the United States show that the daily average of screen time increases with age. TV and video games were once largest contributors to children's screen time, but the past decade has seen a shift towards smart phones and tablets. Specifically, a 2011 nationally representative survey of American parents of children from birth to age 8 suggests that TV accounted for 51% of children's total daily screen time, while mobile devices only accounted for 4%. However, in 2017, TV dropped down to 42% of children's total daily screen time, and mobile media devices jumped up to 35%.

Average daily screen time of American children & teens
Age group (in years)	Daily average screen time	Year data was collected
Under 2	42 minutes	2017
2–4	2 hours	2017
5–8	2 hours	2017
8-10	6 hours	2024
11-14	9 hours	2024

==== Race, socioeconomic class, and screen time ====
Research has shown that race and socioeconomic class are associated with overall screen time. Younger demographics and individuals who self-identified as Black and "Other" were associated with above-average screen use. Additionally, Black and Latino Americans had longer screen times because of less access to desktop computers, which thus leads to more time on phones. In children, the divide is much larger. On average in 2011, White children spent 8.5 hours a day with digital media, and Black and Latino children spent about 13 hours a day on screens. Black and Latino children were also more likely to have TVs in their rooms, which contributed to their increased use of screen time.

The discrepancy in the amount of screen time can also be attributed to a difference in income. In more affluent private schools, there has been a larger push to remove screens from education in order to limit the negative impacts that have been found from screen time. However, in public schools there is more push for the use of technology with some public schools advertising free iPads and laptops to students. Additionally, affluent families can afford nannies and extracurriculars that can limit the need for entertainment from screens.

=== Effects of COVID-19 pandemic ===
The COVID-19 pandemic in 2020 increased screen time as people stayed indoors, adding to concerns about the effects of excessive screen time. Specialists called for limiting screen time and for living a more active lifestyle.

Studies have shown that even after children returned to school following a period of online schooling, which significantly increased daily screen time, their level of physical activity has remained low, while screen time has increased. Due to the increase in screen time, many children gained weight during this time.

== Physical health effects ==
=== Sleep ===
More screen time has been linked with shorter sleep duration, decreased sleep efficiency, and longer sleep onset delay. When using any screen before bedtime, the blue light emitted disrupts the body's natural melatonin hormone production. Melatonin is produced by the brain's pineal gland and controls the body's internal clock. This clock is what is referred to as the body's circadian rhythm and it naturally is responsive to light. Melatonin levels increase as the sun sets and remain at that increased state for the remainder of the night. As the sun rises, melatonin levels start to drop. This hormone reduction is what helps the body's natural rhythm wake up due to the bursts of natural sunlight. The light screens emit is in a similar spectrum of sunlight, but the blue light emission is what human circadian rhythms are most sensitive to. Studies have shown that the blue wavelengths are closely correlated to those from sunlight, which is what helps the body keep in sync with the sunrise and sunset. Therefore, using any screen prior to bedtime disrupts the body's production of natural bedtime hormones which can trick the brain to believe it is still daytime making it harder to fall asleep.

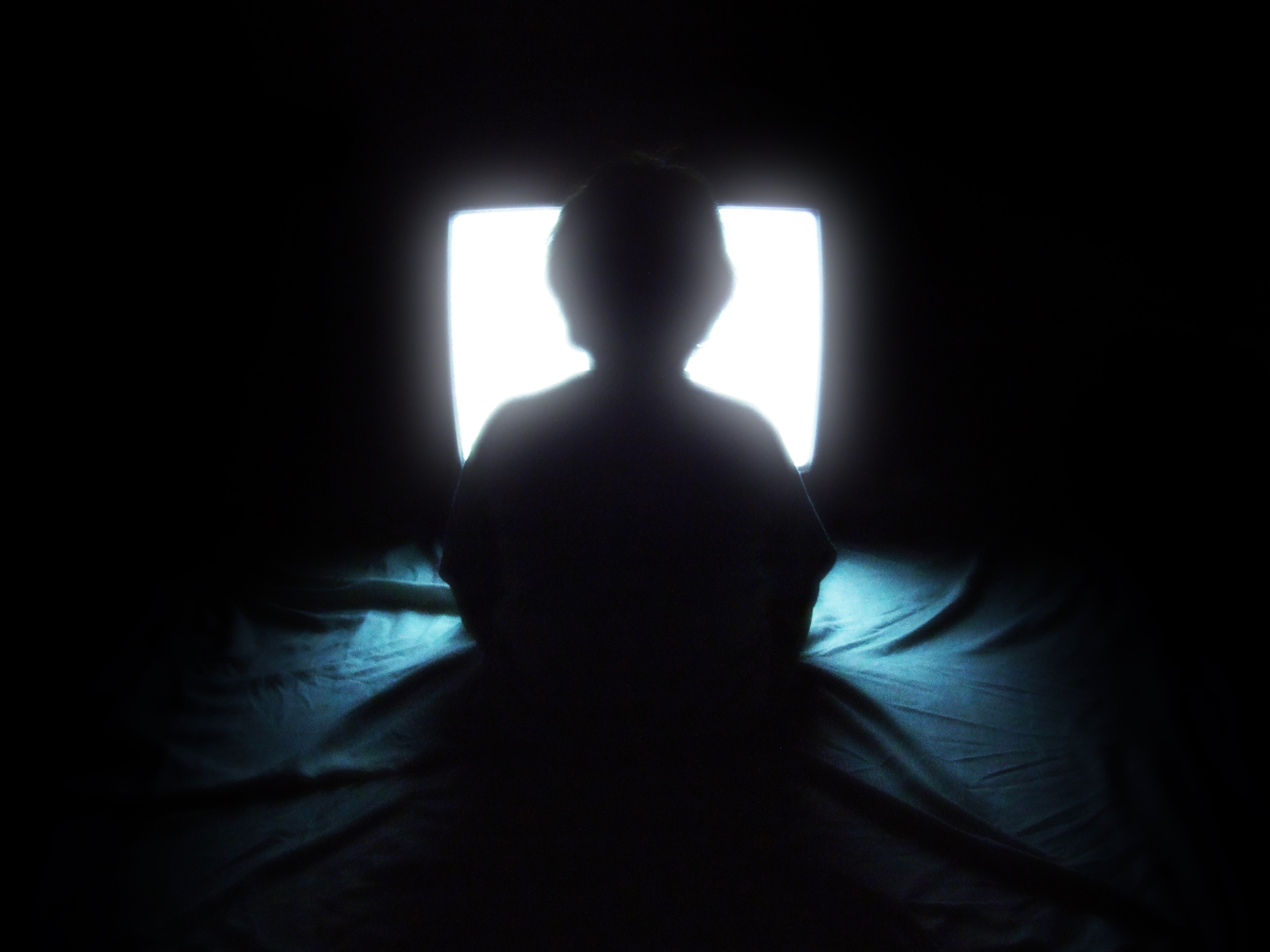
A child watching television at night

Increased use of screens in children has also been shown to have an association with adverse effects on the quality of sleep in children. A 2010 review concluded that "the use of electronic media by children and adolescents does have a negative impact on their sleep, although the precise effects and mechanisms remain unclear", with the most consistent results associating excessive media use with shorter sleep duration and delayed bed times. A 2016 meta-analysis found that "Bedtime access and use of media devices was significantly associated with inadequate sleep quantity; poor sleep quality; and excessive daytime sleepiness". This relationship is because much of the time spent on screens for children is at night, which can cause them to go to sleep later in addition to the blue light from the screens making it more difficult to sleep. However, the relationship between screen use and sleep may not be the same across neurotypical and neurodivergent children. There are reasons to believe that autistic children, for example, may be more interested in screens than their neurotypical peers, and less able to disengage from them. A 2025 systematic review found that a causal link between screen-time use and sleep in autistic children could not be established based on available research findings at the time.

Night-time use of screens is common for Americans ages 12–18: A 2018 nationally representative survey found that 70% use their mobile device within 30 minutes of going to sleep. Data suggests those who had spent more time on their screens were more likely to wake in the night from notifications on their phone, or experience disruptive sleep. In a series of nationally representative surveys, 36% of Americans age 12–18 and 35% of Mexican teens age 13–18 woke up during the night before to check their mobile device. For American children and teens, 54% of those did so because of getting a notification and 51% did so because of the desire to check social media. Content that stirs emotions has been linked with a delay in the onset of sleep.

Many apps promise to improve sleep by filtering out blue light produced by media devices; there have been no large studies to assess whether such apps work. Some users express dissatisfaction with the resultant orange tint of screens. Some people use blue-blocking glasses for the purpose of attempting to block out blue light both from electronic media and from other artificial light sources. The American Academy of Pediatrics recommends that the screen time of children be limited for multiple reasons, including that "Too much screen time can also harm the amount and quality of sleep".

=== Effects on physical health ===
As well as negatively impacting the adult sleep cycle, using screens can also affect one's physical health. Obesity is commonly correlated with big screen times. Studies have suggested that if the amount of screen time adolescents spend was limited, the likelihood of obesity can be reduced. However, the associations between discretionary screen time and adverse health outcomes were strongest in those with low grip strength, fitness and physical activity and markedly attenuated in those with the highest levels of grip strength, fitness and physical activity.

This sedentary behavior is largely due to the nature of most electronic activities. Sitting to watch television, playing computer games or surfing the Internet takes time away from physical activities which leads to an increased risk of weight gain. It has been found that children (kindergarten and 1st graders) who watch 1–2 hours of television a day are more likely to be overweight or obese than children who watch less than one hour a day. Additionally, one study showed that the increased use of video games and other forms of media consumption led to more back pain among Norwegian teens.

It has been reported that screen time negatively affects health in children independently of their physical activity and eating habits. One possible explanation for the link between TV and obesity is the number of commercials for sugary and unhealthy foods. This advertising can affect what gets purchased and consumed in a household. The effect of advertising was demonstrated in a study where children were shown cartoons with and without food commercials. The children who watched the food commercials along with the cartoons ate 45% more unhealthy snacks than the group who watched the cartoons without food ads.

== Mental health effects ==
As previously discussed, sleep and screen time are heavily impacted by the other and can lead to affecting one's behavior as well. If someone does not get an adequate amount of sleep, it can affect their behavior and performance for the day. High amounts of screen time also can significantly affect a person's mental health, although some have called these findings into question. Excessive screen usage is linked with many mental health effects in children. A systematic review by Santos et al. pointed out that social media use was linked with depressive symptoms among mostly girls and that recreational screen time was linked to negative psychological effects on these children and teens. With screen usage increasing as time progresses, adults have begun spending more and more time focusing their attention on screens and not their own kids. This time spent sitting and viewing a screen has been linked to mental health effects such as anxiety and depression. Adults with screen times of six hours or greater are more likely to suffer from moderate to severe depression. This increased screen time has been shown to be directly correlated with an increased chance of depression in adults. With this added risk, lack of sleep plays a major role in a healthy mindset, and without proper rest, mental health can degrade at a higher rate.

=== Brain development ===
An increase in screen time has been associated with negative cognitive outcomes for children between 0 and 4. A study on Korean children aged 24–30 months old found that toddlers with 3 hours of TV viewing per day were three times as likely to experience a language delay. Toddlers with higher TV time also scored lower on school readiness tests, which measured vocabulary, number knowledge, and classroom engagement. The same outcomes are not present in children older than 4. Children who watched more TV were found to have less brain connectivity between language, visual and cognitive control regions of the brain than their peers who watched less TV.

An ongoing study reported from the National Institutes of Health concluded that preteens who spent over 7 hours on screens a day and children who spend less than 7 hours a day had noticeably different development of their cerebral cortex. This part of the brain usually thins as people mature but the accelerated decrease could potentially be linked to the amount of time spent on screens.

The American Academy of Pediatrics recommends a screen time no longer than 1 hour per day for children aged 3–5. According to a study published in November 2019, children who have longer screen time have slower brain development and reduced "skills like imagery, mental control and self-regulation". The scientists add that: "This is important because the brain is developing the most rapidly in the first five years," "That's when brains are very plastic and soaking up everything, forming these strong connections that last for life." They also stated that screens rapidly changed childhood. The over-exposure also negatively affects literacy, cognition and language skills.

=== Behavioral impact ===
Screen use has been implicated with a slew of behavioral effects, especially in children. The primary effect is an increase in sedentary activity. Approximately 47% of American children spend 2 or more hours per day on screen-based sedentary activities. Research results indicated children who had high amounts of screen time had delayed white matter development, decreased ability to rapidly name objects, and poorer literacy skills. Preschool aged children (between the ages of 3 and 5 years old) with over four hours of screen usages a day were shown to be 1.76 times more likely to have behavioral and conduct problems. This is in contrast with the 25.5% who reported at least 20 minutes of physical activity per day for a week. Additionally, the likelihood of a child participating in physical activity has been shown to decrease with increasing screen use. Screen use can also affect interpersonal skills. UCLA researchers reported that sixth-graders who went five days without screen use were significantly better at reading human emotions than sixth-graders with average screen use. In a study done by Muppalla et al., excessive use of screen time in adolescents is linked with triggering dopamine, which is a neurotransmitter that acts as a reward system in the brain. Leading to these children developing attention deficits, like ADHD (attention deficit hyperactivity disorder) and developing addictive tendencies in these young children. In a literature review done by Anderson et al. (2017), children who have extensive exposure to particularly violent media are at risk of developing aggressive behaviors and a desensitization towards violence. Researchers reviewed longitudinal studies, meta-analyses, experimental and cross-sectional studies from the past 60 years, focusing on video game violence.

=== Language development ===
Children who spend an increased amount of time on screens have fewer opportunities to interact with adults and caregivers which reduces their language development. Language skills are an essential part of early childhood development, and human interaction is the best way for these children to develop those skills. When children are spending most of their time using tablets and screens there are fewer chances for them to interact with adults, like their parents, to expand their language skill set. It has been shown that younger, preschool-aged children and the amount of screen time they are exposed to negatively affect their language development. When these children are spending 2 or more hours on their screens, tablets, TVs it is more likely for them to have a poor vocabulary and show delays when they are starting to speak. In the Journal of Psychiatric Research a research study was performed to show the correlation between screen time and developmental and behavioral issues. This research showed that out of the 28,484 preschool-aged children in the study it was concluded that children with two or more hours of screen time a day were found to have 1.54 to 2.38 times the odds of having a speech disorder and were 1.96 times more likely to have a type of learning disability than those children who had an hour or less of screen time per day.

=== Academic performance ===
Academic performance can be improved by screen time depending on the length and content of exposure. Toddlers after the age of 18 months can be exposed to high-quality programming such as Sesame Street or PBS that provides educational television. The right content can prove beneficial, but too much screen time distracts students from studying. It is important for parents to establish a limit on how much screen time their children can use per day. Limiting and monitoring children's screen usage can increase cognitive development, but further research is required to get a better understanding of how screen time positively affects academic performance. On the other hand, increased screen use has been associated with missing school assignments. Students who use screens for more than two hours a day are twice as likely to not turn in homework on a regular basis.

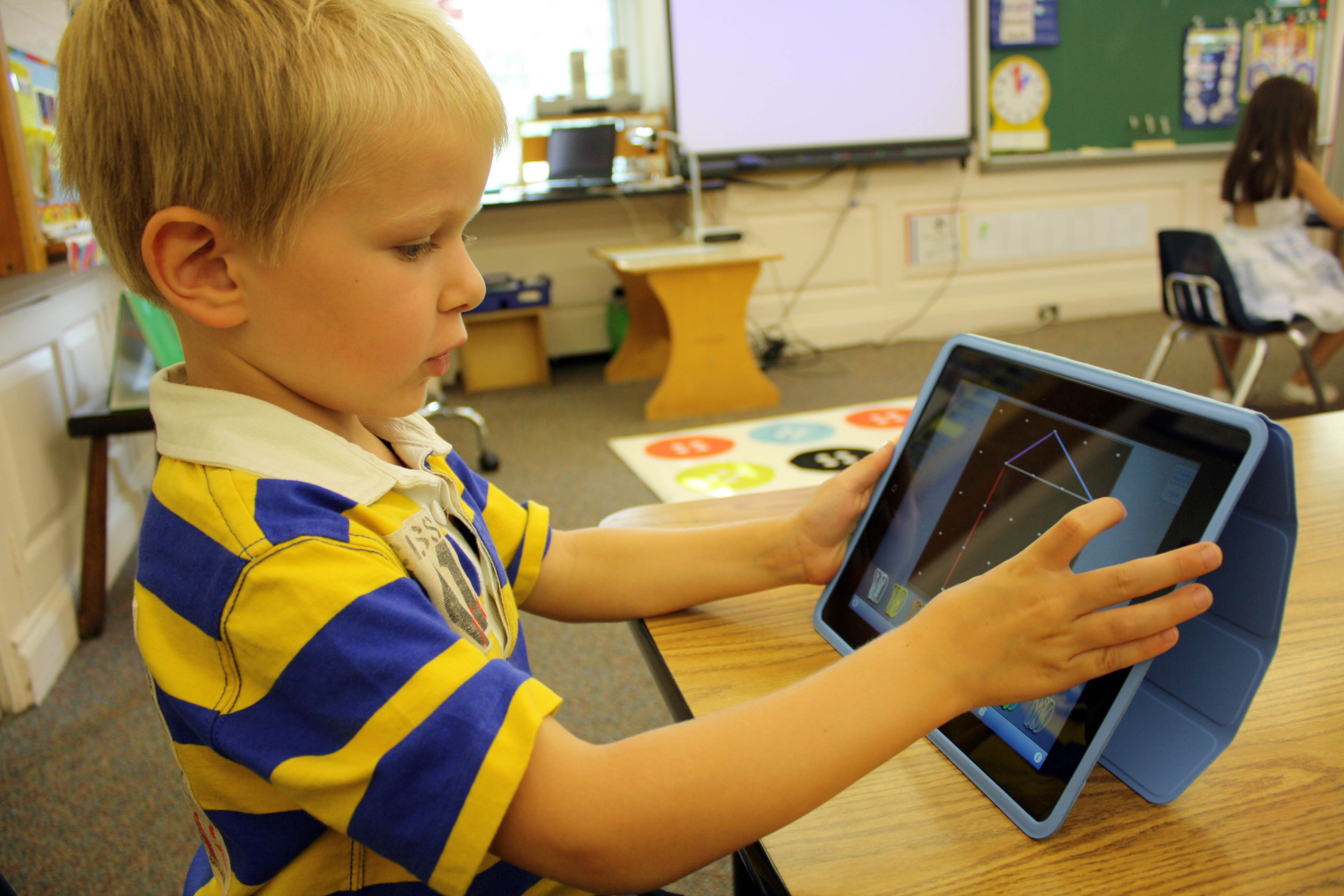
A child using a tablet

Research shows that children who lack guidance from their mothers are more likely to overuse screen time and also to struggle academically. Those with more prevalent maternal interference in their online activities tend to have more controlled screen time. These children also watched more educational content when online versus their counterparts with less parental control. Educational content consumed during time allotted for digital use is shown to be positively associated with academic achievement. On the other hand, those who only consumed violent media or leisurely video games on school nights showed a negative association with academic achievement. Their lower academic performances were marked by decreases in grade averages and in their ability to adjust to a school or academic environment. Inability to adjust to these situations resulted in a negative effect on school performance.

== Environmental effects ==
More screen time generally leads to less time spent in nature and therefore a weaker connection to it. Studies show nature-inspired activities simultaneously decrease for youth in financially stabilized countries with mental health issues increasing, drawing a connection to higher screen time levels. However, the higher the count in activities spent experiencing the outdoors the more positive results were produced in mental health among adolescents.

Digital technologies emitted approximately 4% of the world's greenhouse-gas emissions in the year 2019 and the number could be twice as large by the year 2025. For comparison, the paper pulp and print industries emitted together about 1% in 2010 and about 0.9% in 2012.

== Effects on infants and young children ==
Recent research shows that excessive screen time in children under age three is associated with delayed language development, reduced sleep duration, and lower levels of physical activity. Public health guidelines recommend limiting screen exposure in early childhood and encouraging interactive, caregiver-child activities instead. Some researchers also highlight potential long-term cognitive and behavioral risks linked to early and frequent digital media use.

== Limitations on screen time ==
=== Adults ===
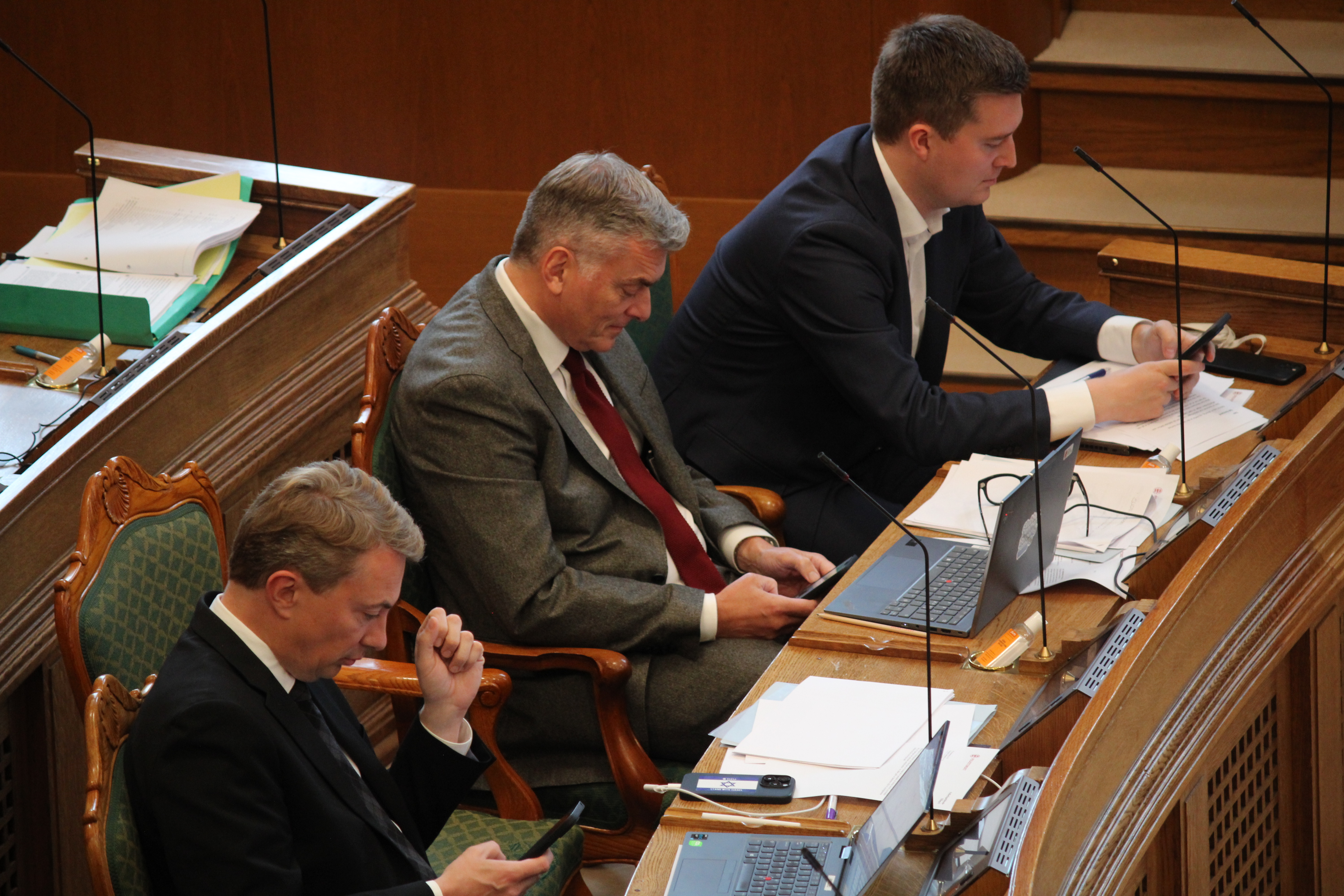
Danish politicians (Morten Messerschmidt, Jan E. Jørgensen, Frederik Bloch Münster) looking in their phones while in session, 2025

There is no consensus on the safe amount of screen time for adults. Many adults spend up to 11 hours a day looking at a screen. Adults often work jobs that require viewing screens which leads to high screen time usage. Adults obligated to view screens for a means of work may not be able to limit screen time to less than two hours, but other recommendations help mitigate negative health effects. For example, breaking up continuous blocks of screen time usage by stretching, maintaining good posture, and intermittently focusing on a distant object for 20 seconds. Furthermore, to mitigate the behavioral effects, adults are encouraged not to eat in front of a screen to avoid habit formation and to keep track of their screen use every day. Specialists also recommend that adults analyze their daily screen time usage and replace some of the unnecessary usage with a physical activity or social event.

=== Children ===
In 2019, the World Health Organization came out with guidelines about media use for children under 5:

- Birth to age 1: No sedentary screen time
- Ages 2–4: No more than 60 minutes of sedentary screen time

More extensive guidelines have been put forth by the American Academy of Pediatrics (AAP) in 2016 for children up to age 5, which include screen time, the quality of content used, and how parents are using screens with their children. The screen time limits are as follows:

- Birth up to 18–24 months: No screen time (except video chatting)
- 18–24 months: Limit screen time as much as possible
- Ages 2–5: Limit screen time to about an hour a day
- Ages 5-18: No more than 5 hours a day

In addition to these screen time guidelines, the AAP recommends that when screen time does occur, the content should be high-quality, educational, slower-paced, and free of violence. Caregivers should avoid giving apps to children that have highly distracting content.

They also recommend that families try to use media with their child so that they can help explain what content is on the screen and how it applies to their own lives. They recommend turning off devices (including TVs) when the child is not actively using them and keeping bedrooms as screen-free zones. Additionally, they recommend that screens should be put away at least 1 hour before bedtime.

For children from ages 5 to 18, the AAP came out with recommendations in 2016 that focus less on the amount of screen time and more on how media is being used. They recommend children and teens should keep devices (including TVs) out of the bedroom during bedtime, and screens should be put away at least 1 hour before bedtime. They recommend that caregivers discourage children and teens from using screens during homework for entertainment purposes. Additionally, they recommend that families come up with a "Family Use Plan" that aligns with their family's needs, values, and goals. This plan should have consistent guidelines and limits for each family member, and families should consider having designated times of the day and areas in the house that are screen-free.

== See also ==
- AppBlock
- Dark therapy
- Delayed sleep phase disorder
- f.lux
- Gaming disorder
- Light effects on circadian rhythm
- Night Shift (software)
- Problematic smartphone use
- Social aspects of television
- Social Media and Psychology
