= Lighting-up time =

Part of the night where motor vehicles must be lit in the UK

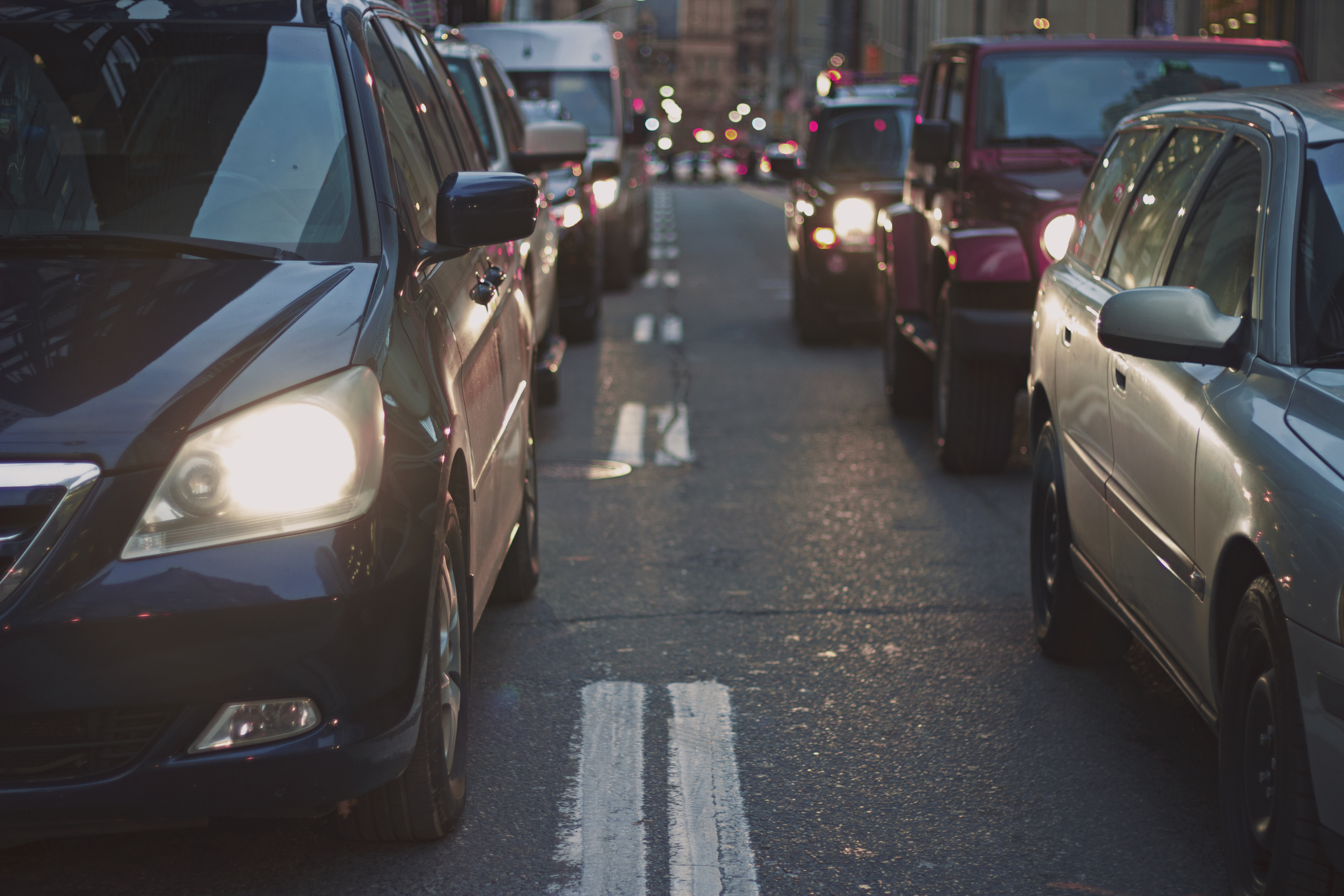
Car headlights in the early evening

In the United Kingdom, lighting-up time is a legally-enforced period from half an hour after sunset to half an hour before sunrise, during which all motor vehicles on unlit public roads (except if parked) must use their headlights.

== History ==
Lighting-up time was first introduced in the nineteenth century in local by-laws and enforced nationally by the Lights on Vehicles Act 1907. In the 1920s, service stations started displaying cardboard clock-face displays, set to the lighting-up time for the day. This is a crucial plot point in the Montague Egg detective story "Murder in the Morning" by Dorothy L. Sayers.

The Road Lighting Act 1942 stipulated 1 hour after sunset/before sunrise. It was amended to 30 minutes by the Road Traffic Act 1956 because of the increasing speed of traffic. These were the required times for showing all lights on all vehicles, including bicycles and horse-drawn carts, hence the name lighting-up time.

The current Road Vehicles Lighting Regulations 1989 (RVLR) tightened the requirements further. Lighting-up time is retained as the required period for use of motor vehicle headlights on roads without lit streetlights, but with that exception, all vehicles must now keep conspicuity lights lit during the longer period of sunset to sunrise (unless parked, in a designated parking place and facing the same way as adjacent traffic and more than 10 metres (33 ft) from the nearest junction on a road with a speed limit not exceeding 30 miles per hour (48 km/h). Note that this exemption applies for only "a motor vehicle being a goods vehicle the unladen weight of which does not exceed 1525 kg"). The conspicuity lights required are "front and rear position lamps" (side and tail lights) plus, for large vehicles, side marker lamps and end-outline marker lamps and, for motor vehicles, rear number plate lights.

Different rules apply to bicycles; the RVLR state that "Lights (and reflectors) are required on a pedal cycle only between sunset and sunrise. Lights (and reflectors) are not required when the cycle is stationary or being pushed along the roadside. When they are required, the lights and reflectors listed below must be clean and working properly."

Headlights are also required at other times when visibility is restricted, e.g. by fog, rain, snow, overcast sky or smoke. They should also be used in tunnels.

Streetlights are usually set to come on automatically near the beginning of lighting-up time, although modern lamps monitor the light level and turn on when this gets too low, and so are influenced by weather. They may also be set to switch off automatically when road usage is reduced, often at midnight, although currently most stay on until about the end of lighting-up time.

Sunrise and sunset are defined by the Road Vehicles Lighting Regulations as local sunrise and sunset so the times are different in different parts of the UK; they are earlier in the east and later in the west, and vary more with the seasons in northerly locations than in southerly locations.

Lighting-up times were formerly commonly displayed in national and local newspapers in the UK and announced on national and local radio stations, but the widespread adoption of street lighting has rendered this largely redundant. As a result, most of the previous sources no longer provide them, but may still provide sunrise/sunset times.

== See also ==
- Civil twilight, period when enough natural light remains that artificial light is not needed
