= RedShift (astronomy software) =

- Developer: Maris Technologies
- Release: 1993
- Operating system: Windows; Macintosh

RedShift, also known as RedShift Multimedia Astronomy, is a software CD-ROM from Maris Technologies.

== Summary ==
RedShift allows the user to view things in the solar system from any location. It also allows the user to record the events being simulated on the screen, creating a Quick Time video file that can be viewed independently of the program.

== Development ==
RedShift was developed by Maris Technologies, a company founded in 1992.

== Reception ==
Los Angeles Times called RedShift a spectacular CD-ROM. The Oregonian gave RedShift a very good rating.

RedShift sold over 1 million copies.
