= Twilight =

Atmospheric illumination by the Sun below the horizon

Twilight is the period between dawn and sunrise, and between sunset and dusk.

Morning twilight: astronomical, nautical, and civil stages at dawn. The apparent disk of the Sun is shown to scale.

Evening twilight: civil, nautical, and astronomical stages at dusk. The solar disk is shown to scale.

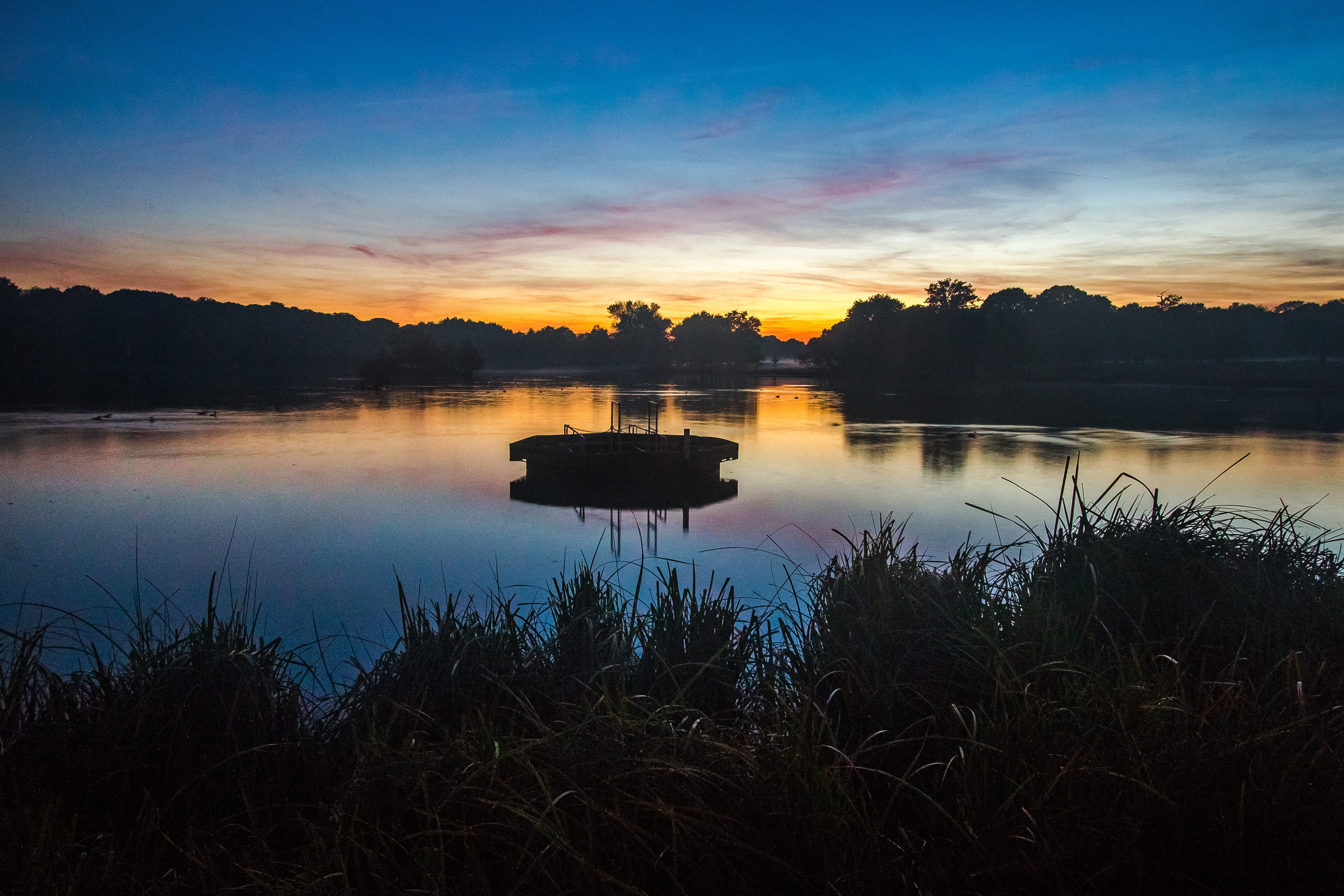
Twilight over a lake

Twilight is daylight illumination produced by diffuse sky radiation when the Sun is below the horizon as sunlight from the upper atmosphere is scattered in a way that illuminates both the Earth's lower atmosphere and also the Earth's surface. Twilight also may be any period when this illumination occurs, including dawn and dusk.

The lower the Sun is beneath the horizon, the dimmer the sky (other factors such as atmospheric conditions being equal). When the Sun reaches 18° below the horizon, the illumination emanating from the sky is nearly zero, and evening twilight becomes nighttime. When the Sun approaches re-emergence, reaching 18° below the horizon, nighttime becomes morning twilight. Owing to its distinctive quality, primarily the absence of shadows and the appearance of objects silhouetted against the lit sky, twilight has long been popular with photographers and painters, who often refer to it as the blue hour, after the French expression l'heure bleue.

By analogy with evening twilight, sometimes twilight is used metaphorically to imply that something is losing strength and approaching its end. For example, very old people may be said to be "in the twilight of their lives". The collateral adjective for twilight is crepuscular, which may be used to describe the behavior of animals that are most active during this period.

== Definitions by geometry ==
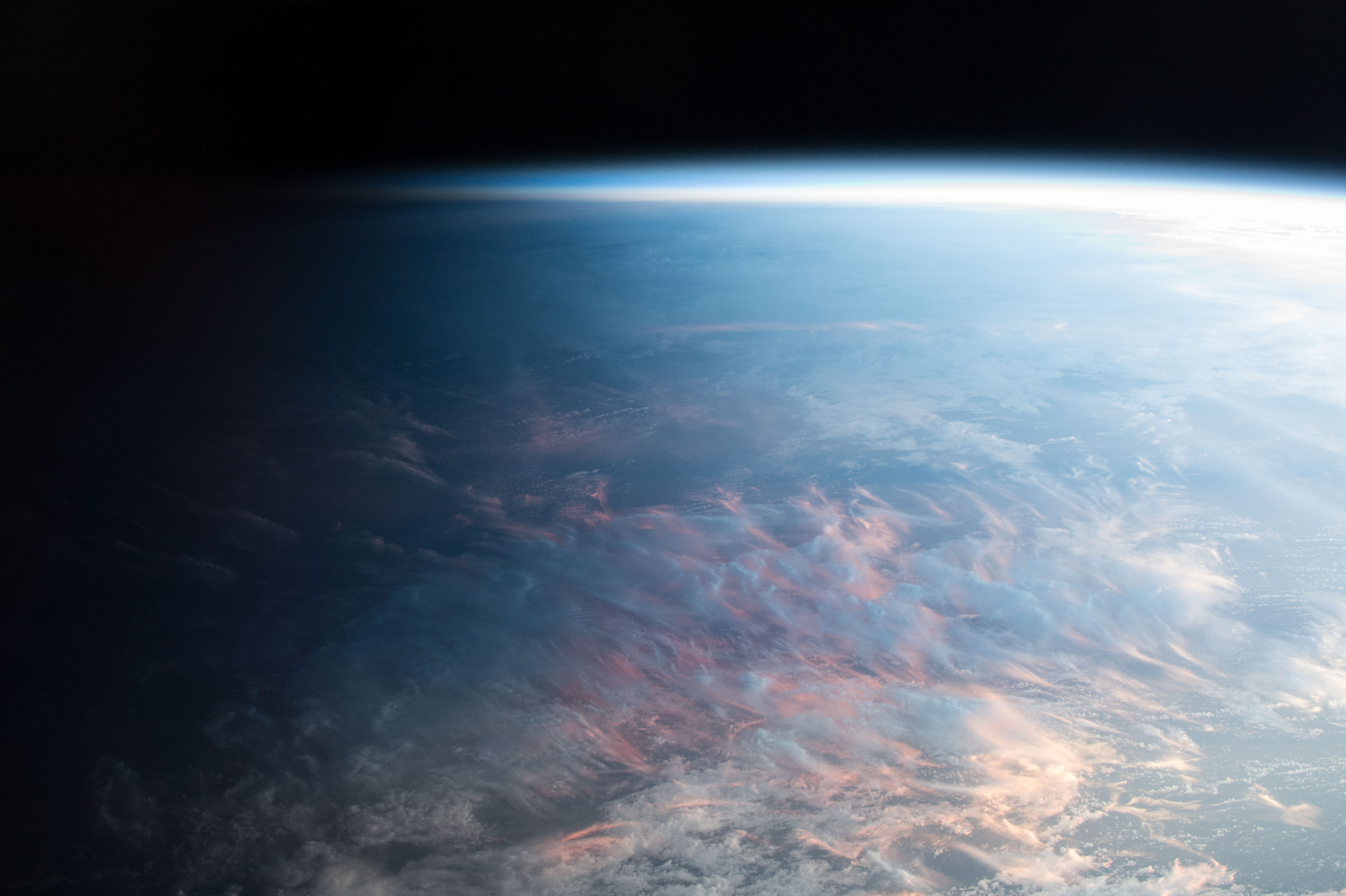
Twilight as viewed from space

Twilight occurs according to the solar elevation angle, which is the position of the geometric center of the Sun relative to the horizon. There are three established and widely accepted subcategories of twilight: civil twilight (nearest the horizon), nautical twilight, and astronomical twilight (farthest from the horizon).

== Civil twilight ==
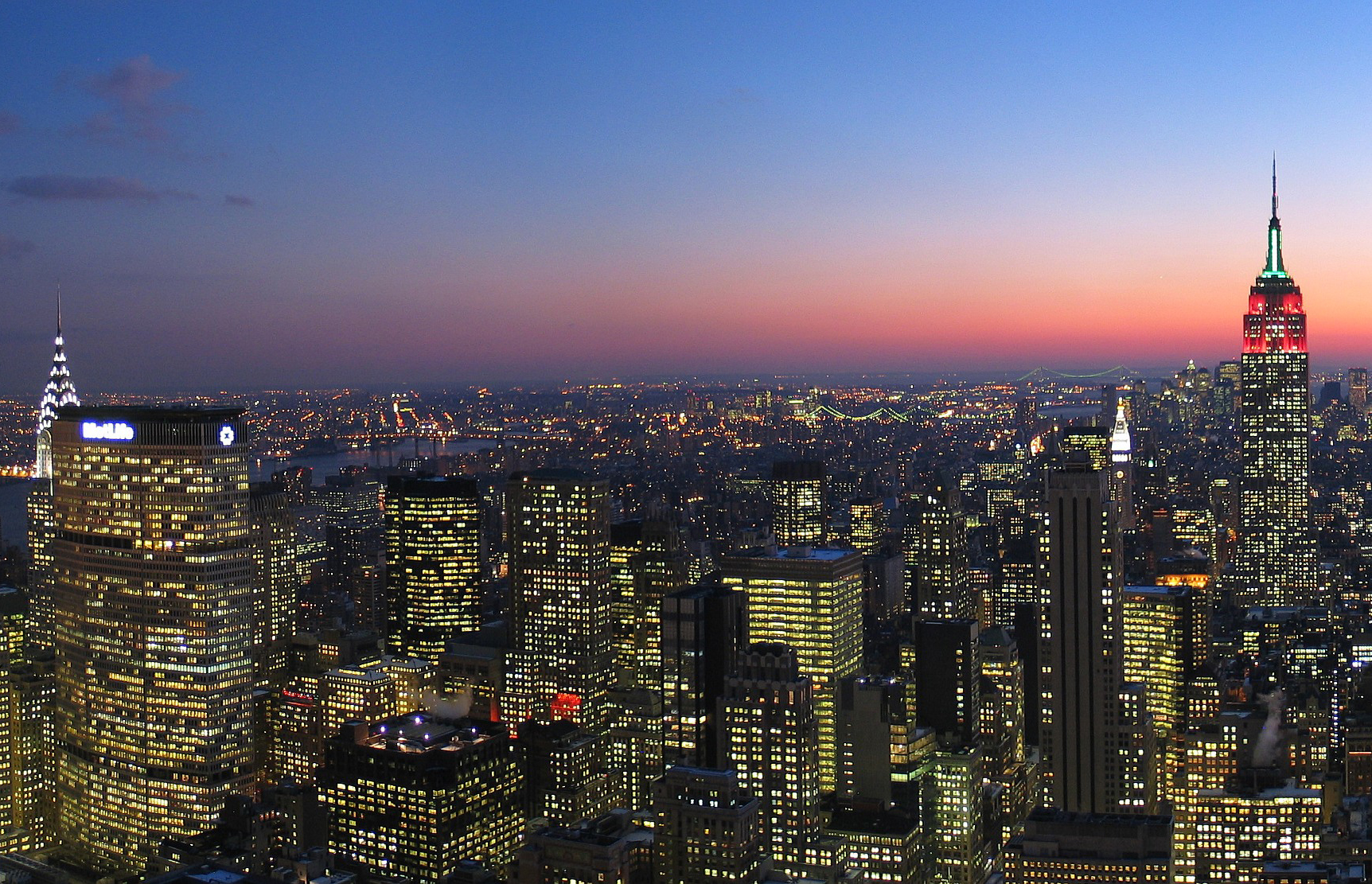
Midtown Manhattan during civil twilight, demonstrating blue hour

Civil twilight is the period of time for which the geometric center of the Sun is between the horizon and 6° below the horizon.

Civil twilight is the period when enough natural light remains so that artificial light in towns and cities is not needed to see adequately. In the United States' military, the initialisms BMCT (begin morning civil twilight, i.e., civil dawn) and EECT (end evening civil twilight, i.e., civil dusk) are used to refer to the start of morning civil twilight and the end of evening civil twilight, respectively. Civil dawn is preceded by morning nautical twilight and civil dusk is followed by evening nautical twilight.

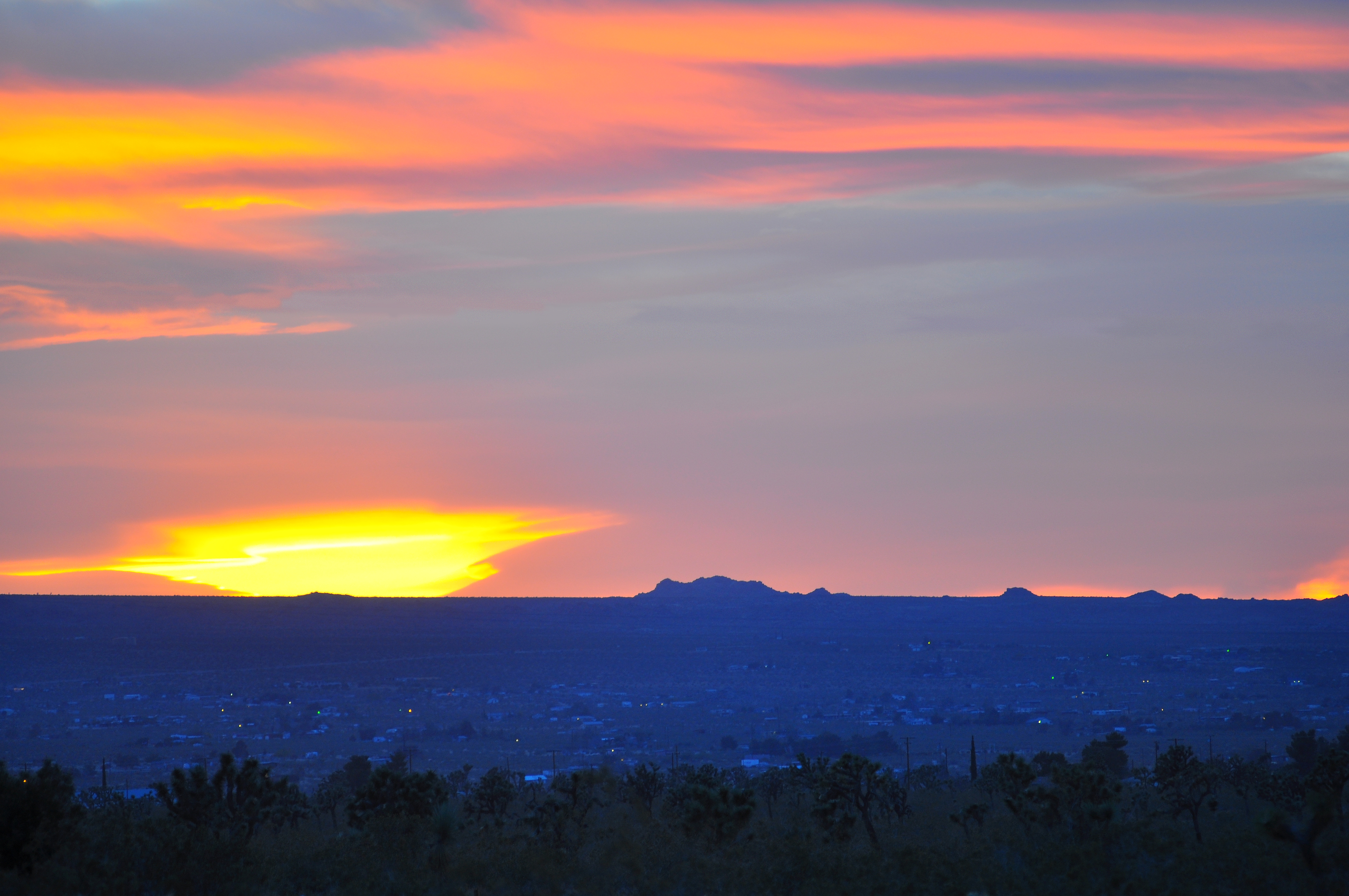
Civil twilight in a small town in the Mojave Desert

Under clear weather conditions, civil twilight approximates the limit at which solar illumination suffices for the human eye to clearly distinguish terrestrial objects. Enough illumination renders artificial sources unnecessary for most outdoor activities. At civil dawn and at civil dusk, sunlight clearly defines the horizon while the brightest stars and planets can appear. As observed from the Earth (see apparent magnitude), sky-gazers know Venus, the brightest planet, as the "morning star" or "evening star" because they can see it during civil twilight.

Although "civil dawn" marks the time of the first appearance of civil twilight before sunrise, and "civil dusk" marks the time of the first disappearance of civil twilight after sunset, civil twilight statutes typically denote a fixed period after sunset or before sunrise (most commonly 20–30 minutes) rather than how many degrees the Sun is below the horizon. Examples include when drivers of automobiles must turn on their headlights (called lighting-up time in the UK), when hunting is restricted, or when the crime of burglary is to be treated as nighttime burglary, which carries stiffer penalties in some jurisdictions.

The period may affect when extra equipment, such as anti-collision lights, is required for aircraft to operate. In the US, civil twilight for aviation is defined in Part 1.1 of the Federal Aviation Regulations (FARs) as the time listed in the American Air Almanac.

== Nautical twilight ==
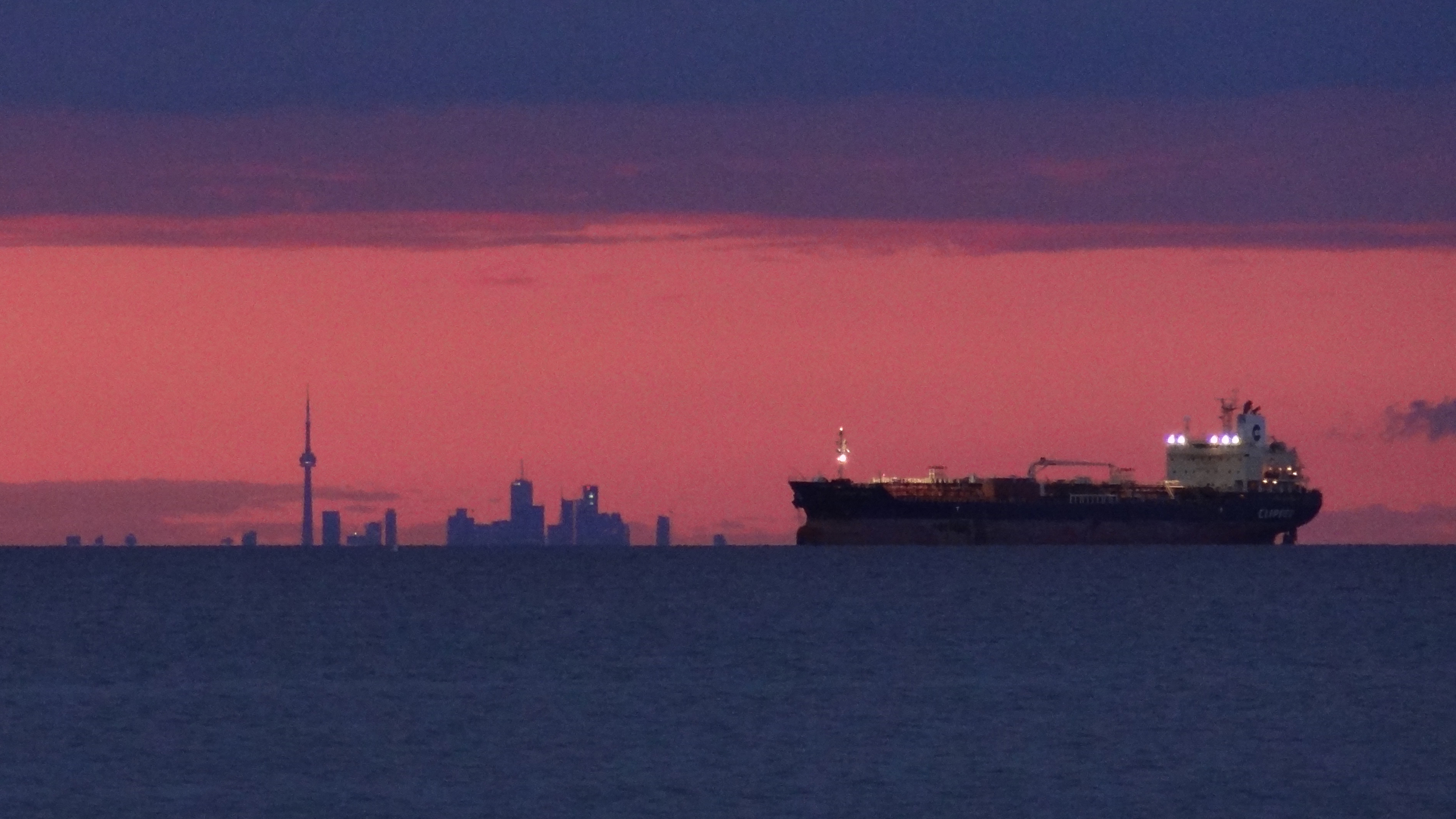
Evening nautical twilight on Lake Ontario, Canada

Nautical twilight occurs when the geometric center of the Sun is between 12° and 6° below the horizon.

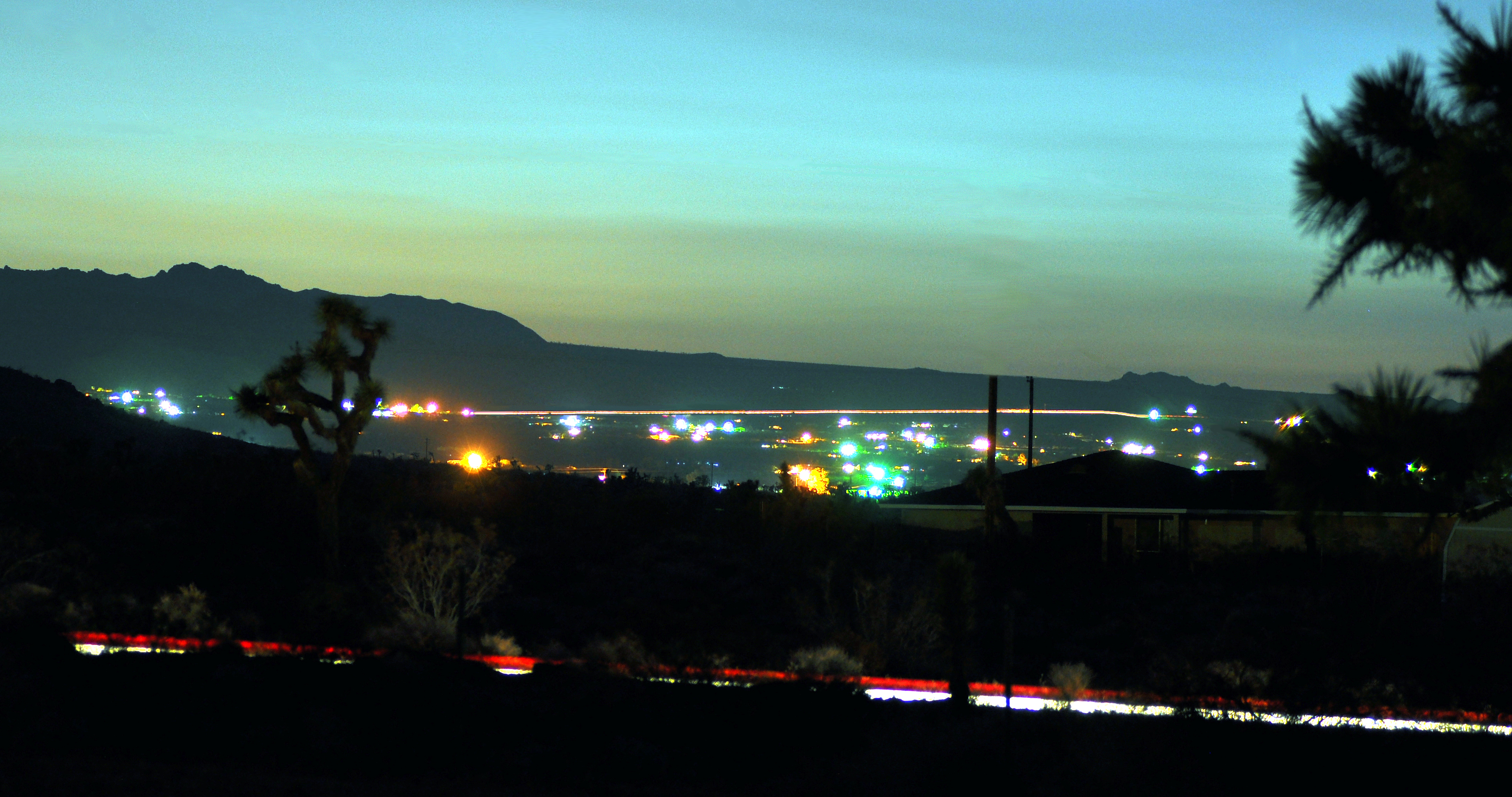
Long exposure of nautical twilight in a small town in the Mojave Desert

After nautical dusk and before nautical dawn, sailors cannot navigate via the horizon at sea as they cannot clearly see the horizon. At nautical dawn and nautical dusk, the human eye finds it difficult, if not impossible, to discern traces of illumination near the sunset or sunrise point of the horizon (first light after nautical dawn but before civil dawn and nightfall after civil dusk but before nautical dusk).

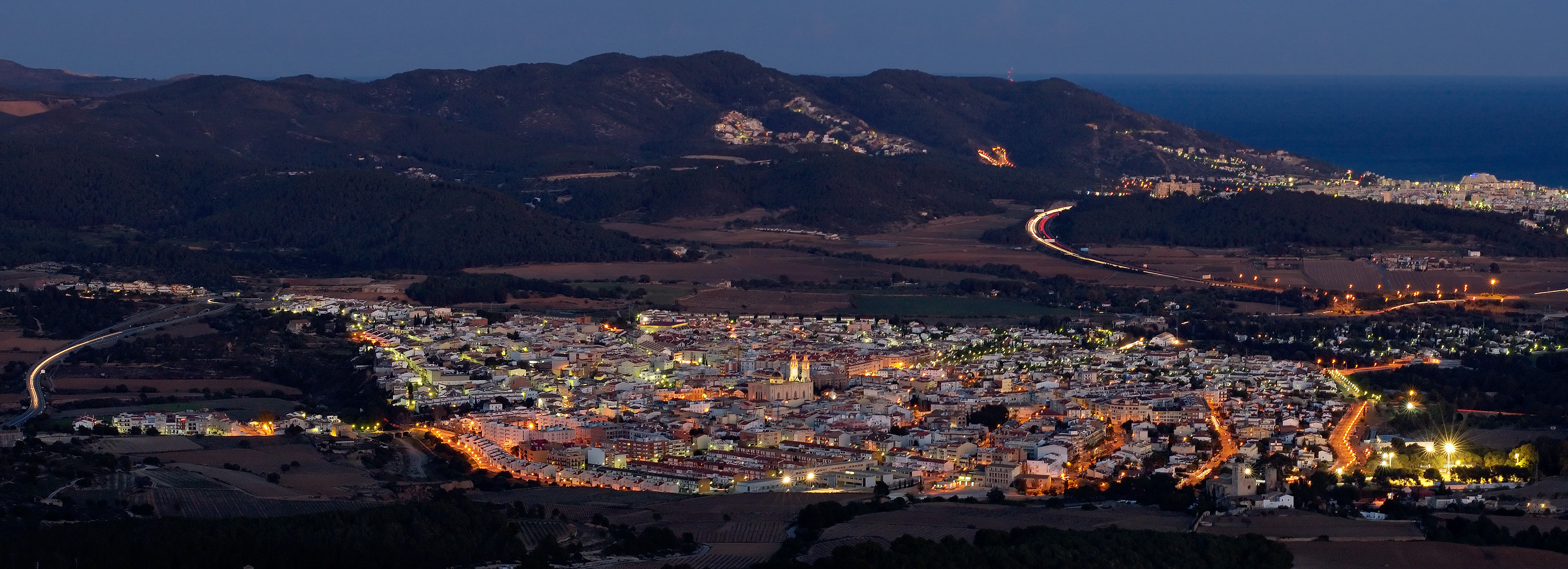
At the beginning of nautical twilight, artificial lighting must be used to see terrestrial objects clearly.

Sailors can take reliable star sightings of well-known stars, during the stage of nautical twilight when they can distinguish a visible horizon for reference (i.e. after nautical dawn or before nautical dusk).

Under good atmospheric conditions with the absence of other illumination, during nautical twilight, the human eye may distinguish general outlines of ground objects but cannot participate in detailed outdoor operations.

Nautical twilight has military considerations as well. The initialisms "BMNT" ("begin morning nautical twilight", i.e., nautical dawn) and "EENT" ("end evening nautical twilight", i.e., nautical dusk) are used and considered when planning military operations. A military unit may treat BMNT and EENT with heightened security, e.g. by "standing to", for which everyone assumes a defensive position.

== Astronomical twilight ==
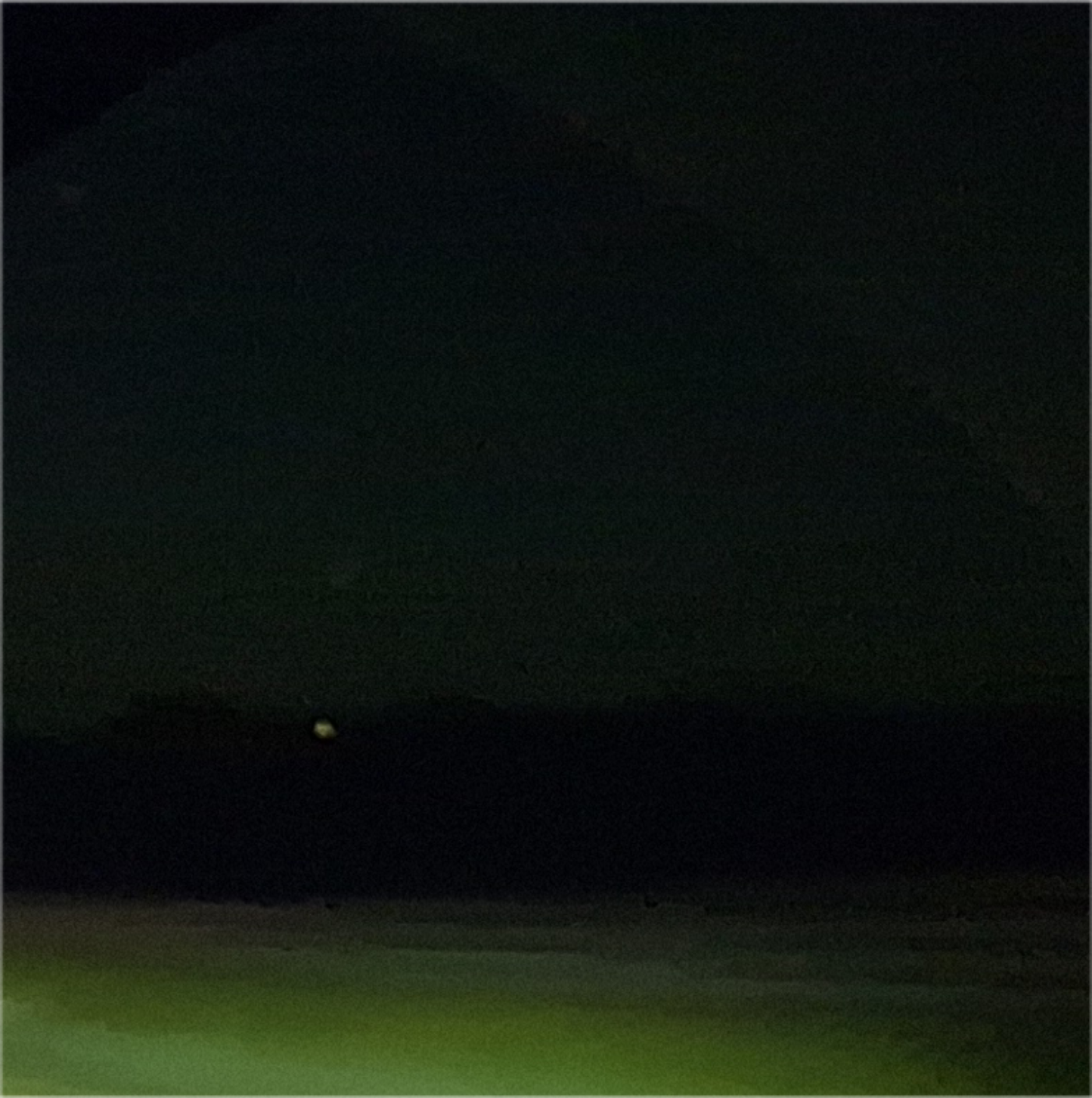
Astronomical twilight photographed with the Sun being approximately 15° below the horizon.

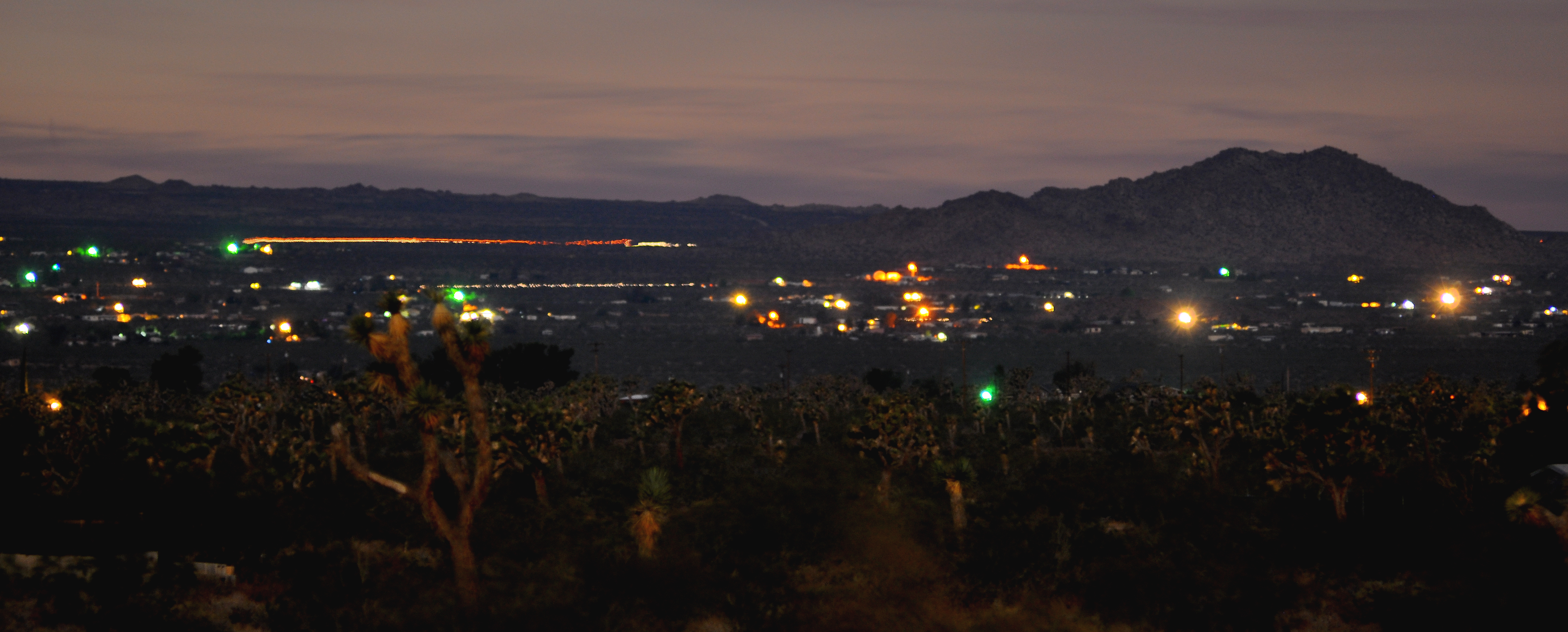
Long exposure of astronomical twilight in a small town in the Mojave Desert

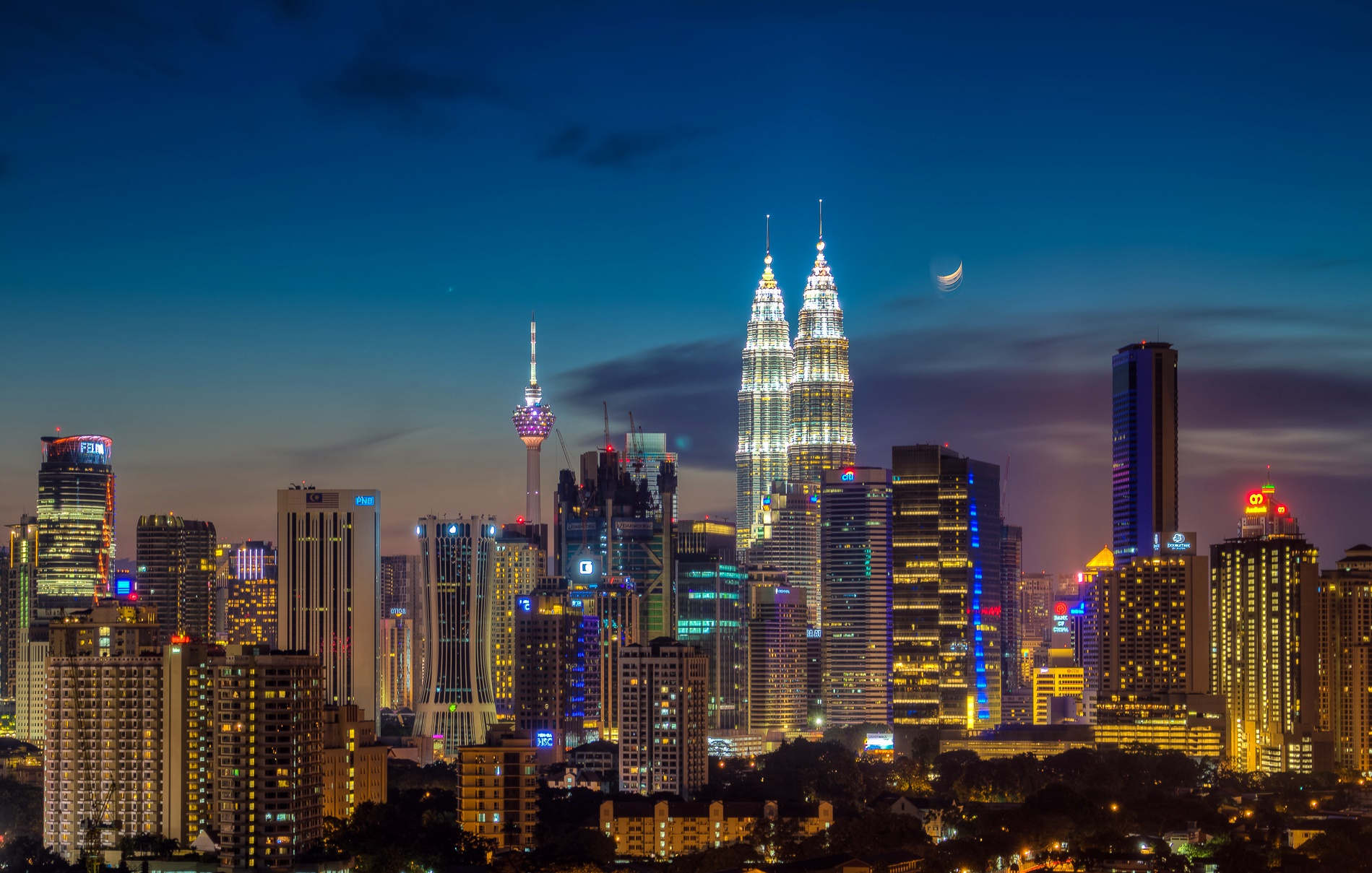
Astronomical twilight (dusk) with a crescent moon, as seen from Kuala Lumpur, Malaysia

Astronomical twilight occurs when the geometric center of the Sun is between 18° and 12° below the horizon. During astronomical twilight, the sky is dark enough to permit astronomical observation of point sources of light such as stars, except in regions with more intense skyglow due to light pollution, moonlight, auroras, and other sources of light. Some critical observations, such as of faint diffuse items such as nebulae and galaxies, may require observation beyond the limit of astronomical twilight. Theoretically, the faintest stars detectable by the naked eye (those of approximately the sixth magnitude) will become visible in the evening at astronomical dusk, and become invisible at astronomical dawn.

== Times of occurrence ==
World map showing limiting latitudes of each type of twilight during the solstices

=== Between day and night ===
Observers within about 48°34' of the Equator can view twilight twice each day on every date of the year between astronomical dawn, nautical dawn, or civil dawn, and sunrise as well as between sunset and civil dusk, nautical dusk, or astronomical dusk. This also occurs for most observers at higher latitudes on many dates throughout the year, except those around the summer solstice. However, at latitudes closer than 8°35' (between 81°25’ and 90°) to either Pole, the Sun cannot rise above the horizon nor sink more than 18° below it on the same day on any date, so this example of twilight cannot occur because the angular difference between solar noon and solar midnight is less than 17°10’.

Observers within about 63°26' of the Equator can view twilight twice each day on every date between the month of the autumnal equinox and the month of vernal equinox between astronomical dawn, nautical dawn, or civil dawn, and sunrise as well as between sunset and civil dusk, nautical dusk, or astronomical dusk, i.e., from September 1 to March 31 of the following year in the Northern Hemisphere and from March 1 to September 30 in the Southern Hemisphere.

The maximum latitude to view both astronomical dawn to sunrise and from sunset to astronomical dusk in the entire year is 48º33'43". The maximum latitude to view both astronomical dawn to sunrise and from sunset to astronomical dusk in the months that includes autumn and winter is 63º26'07".

The nighttime/twilight boundary solar midnight's latitude varies depending on the month:

- In January or July, astronomical dawn to sunrise or sunset to astronomical dusk occurs at latitudes less than 48°50' North or South, because then the Sun's declination is less than 23°10' from the Equator;
- In February or August, astronomical dawn to sunrise or sunset to astronomical dusk occurs at latitudes less than 53°47' North or South, because then the Sun's declination is less than 18°13' from the Equator;
- In March or September before the equinoxes, astronomical dawn to sunrise or sunset to astronomical dusk occurs at latitudes less than 63°26' North or South, because before the equinoxes the Sun's declination is then less than 8°34' from the Equator;
- During the equinoxes, astronomical dawn to sunrise or sunset to astronomical dusk occurs at latitudes less than 72°00' North or South, because during the equinoxes the Sun is crossing the Equator line;
- In March or September after the equinoxes, astronomical dawn to sunrise or sunset to astronomical dusk occurs at latitudes less than 67°45' North or South, because after the equinoxes the Sun's declination is then less than 4°15' from the Equator;
- In April or October, astronomical dawn to sunrise or sunset to astronomical dusk occurs at latitudes less than 57°09' North or South, because the Sun's declination is then less than 14°51' from the Equator;
- In May or November, astronomical dawn to sunrise or sunset to astronomical dusk occurs at latitudes less than 50°03' North or South, because the Sun's declination is then less than 21°57' from the Equator;
- In June or December, astronomical dawn to sunrise or sunset to astronomical dusk occurs at latitudes less than 48°34' North or South, because in June the Sun crosses the Tropic of Cancer (about 23°26' North) and in December the Sun crosses the Tropic of Capricorn (about 23°26' South).

=== Lasting from one day to the next ===
Timelapse video of twilight and sunrise in Gjøvik in February 2021

At latitudes greater than about 48°34' North or South, on dates near the summer solstice (June 21 in the Northern Hemisphere or December 21 in the Southern Hemisphere), twilight can last from sunset to sunrise, since the Sun does not sink more than 18 degrees below the horizon, so complete darkness does not occur even at solar midnight. These latitudes include many densely populated regions of the Earth, including the entire United Kingdom and other countries in northern Europe and even parts of central Europe. This also occurs in the Southern Hemisphere, but occurs on December 21. This type of twilight also occurs between one day and the next at latitudes within the polar circles shortly before and shortly after the period of midnight sun. The summer solstice in the Northern Hemisphere is on June 21st, while the summer solstice in the Southern Hemisphere is on December 21st.

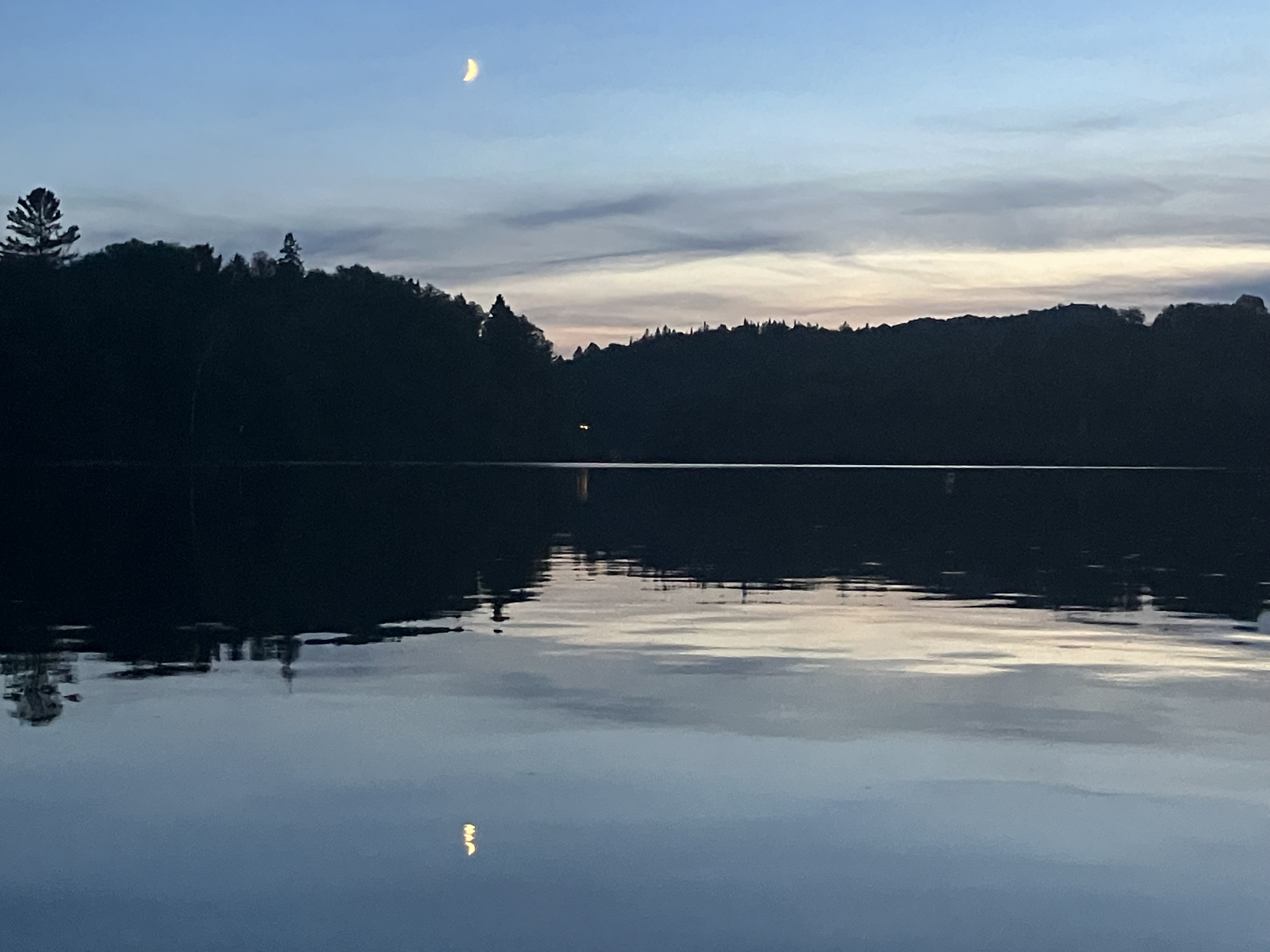
- Twilight in Quebec
  Civil twilight: between about 60°34' and 65°44' north or south. In the northern hemisphere, this includes the center of Alaska, Iceland, Finland, Sweden, Norway, Faroe Islands, and part of Shetland. In the southern hemisphere this includes parts of the Southern Ocean and the northern tip of the Antarctic Peninsula. When civil twilight lasts all night, this is also referred as a white night.
- Nautical twilight: between about 54°34' and 60°34' north or south. In the northern hemisphere this includes the center of Alaska, Russia, Canada, Estonia, Latvia, Scotland, Norway, Sweden, Finland, Lithuania, and Denmark. In the southern hemisphere this includes the southernmost point of South America, Ushuaia in Argentina, and Puerto Williams in Chile. When nautical twilight lasts all night, this does not constitute a white night, which requires the Sun to remain less than 6 degrees below the horizon all night. This phenomenon is known as the grey night, a night when it does not get dark enough for astronomers to do their observations of the deep sky.
- Astronomical twilight: between about 48°34' and 54°34' north or south. In the northern hemisphere, this includes the center of Isle of Man, Aleutian Islands, United Kingdom, Belarus, Ireland, Netherlands, Poland, Germany, Belgium, Czech Republic, Bellingham, Washington, Orcas Island, Washington, Vancouver, British Columbia, Paris, France, Luxembourg, Guernsey, Ukraine, Slovakia, and Hungary. In the southern hemisphere, this includes the center of South Georgia and the South Sandwich Islands, Bouvet Island, Heard Island, Falkland Islands. It also includes El Calafate and Río Gallegos in Argentina, and Puerto Natales in Chile. When astronomical twilight lasts all night, this does not constitute a white night, which requires the Sun to remain less than 6 degrees below the horizon all night. This phenomenon is known as the grey night, a night when it does not get dark enough for astronomers to do their observations of the deep sky.

=== Between one night and the next ===
In Arctic and Antarctic latitudes in wintertime, the polar night only rarely produces complete darkness for 24 hours each day. This can occur only at locations within about 5.5 degrees of latitude of the Pole, and there only on dates close to the winter solstice. At all other latitudes and dates, the polar night includes a daily period of twilight, when the Sun is not far below the horizon. Around winter solstice, when the solar declination changes slowly, complete darkness lasts several weeks at the Pole itself, e.g., from May 11 to July 31 at Amundsen–Scott South Pole Station. (Note: This is the range of dates when the Sun is more than 18 degrees north of the Celestial equator, so it is more than 18 degrees below the horizon as seen from the South Pole. See Position of the Sun#Declination of the Sun as seen from Earth.) North Pole has the experience of this from November 13 to January 29.

Solar noon at civil twilight during a polar night: between about 67°24' and 72°34' north or south.

Solar noon at nautical twilight during a polar night: between about 72°34' and 78°34' north or south.

Solar noon at astronomical twilight during a polar night: between about 78°34' and 84°34' north or south.

Solar noon at night during a polar night: between approximately 84°34' and exactly 90° north or south.

=== Lasting for 24 hours ===
At latitudes greater than 81°25' North or South, as the Sun's angular elevation difference is less than 18 degrees, twilight can last for the entire 24 hours. This occurs for one day at latitudes near 8°35’ from the Pole and extends up to several weeks the further toward the Pole one goes. This happens both near the North Pole and near the South Pole. The only permanent settlement to experience this condition is Alert, Nunavut, Canada, where it occurs from February 22–26, and again from October 15–19.

== Duration ==
The number of daylight hours depends on the latitude and time of year. Each pole has continuous daylight near its summer solstice.

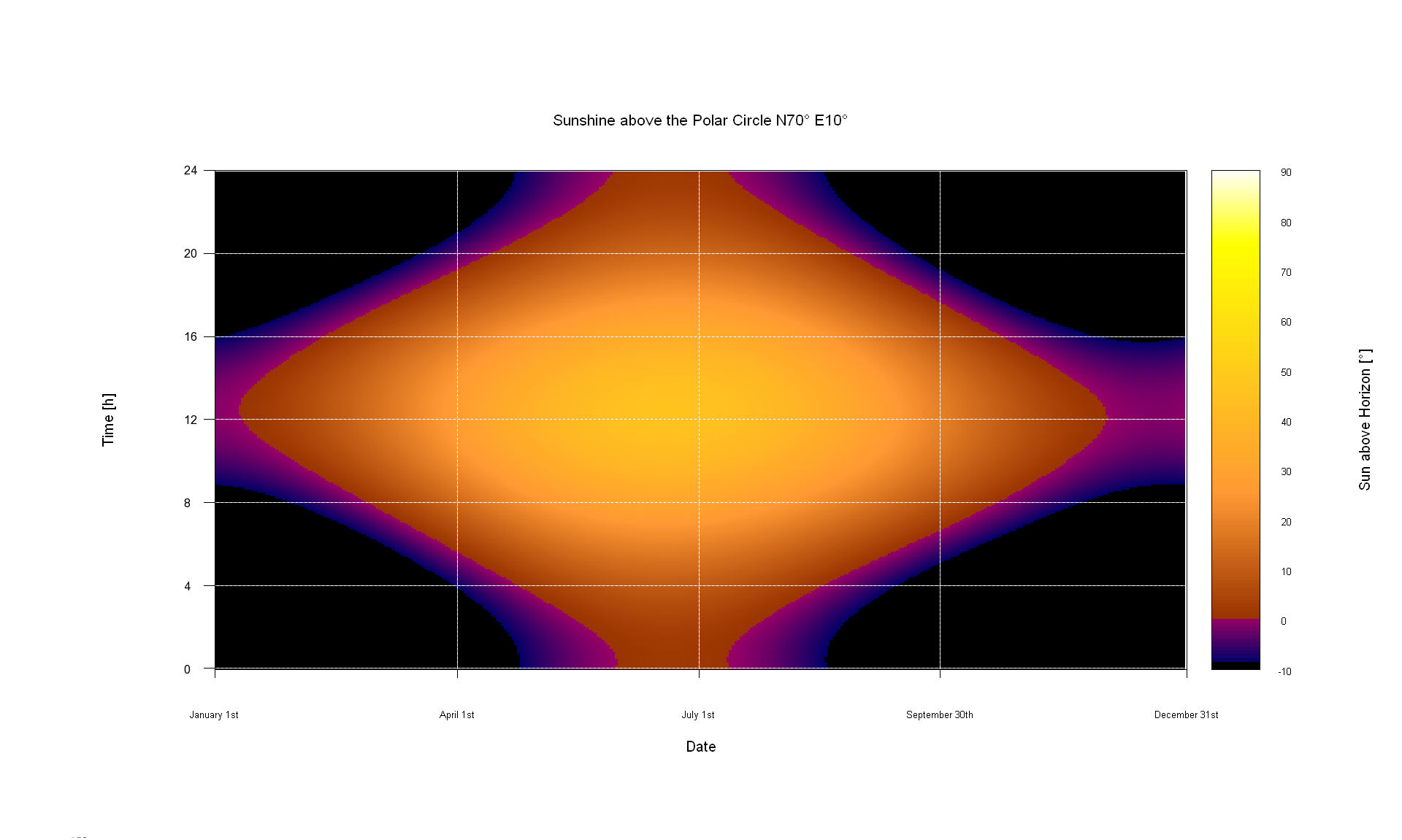
Carpet plot of sunshine at latitude 70° north

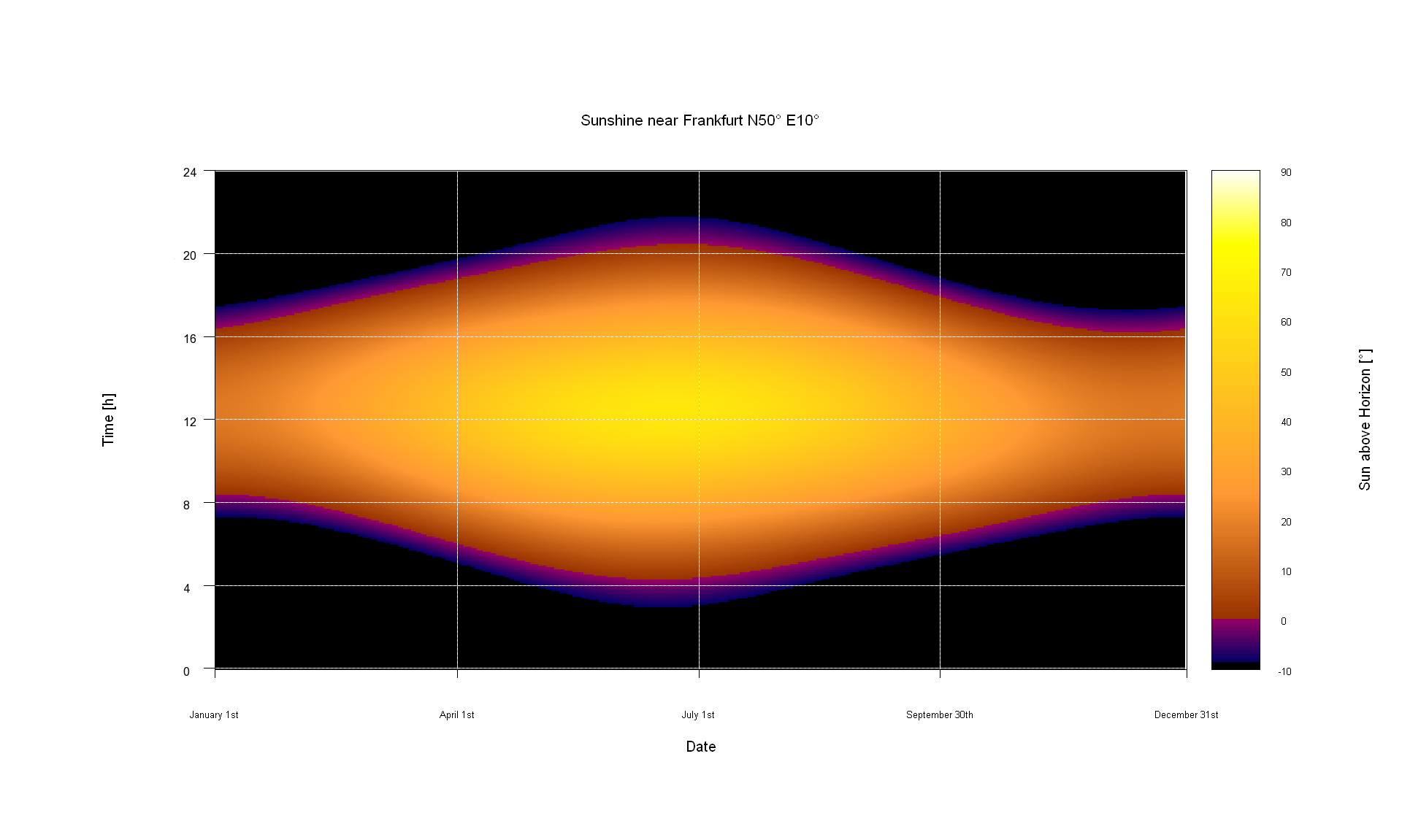
Carpet plot of sunshine at latitude 50° north

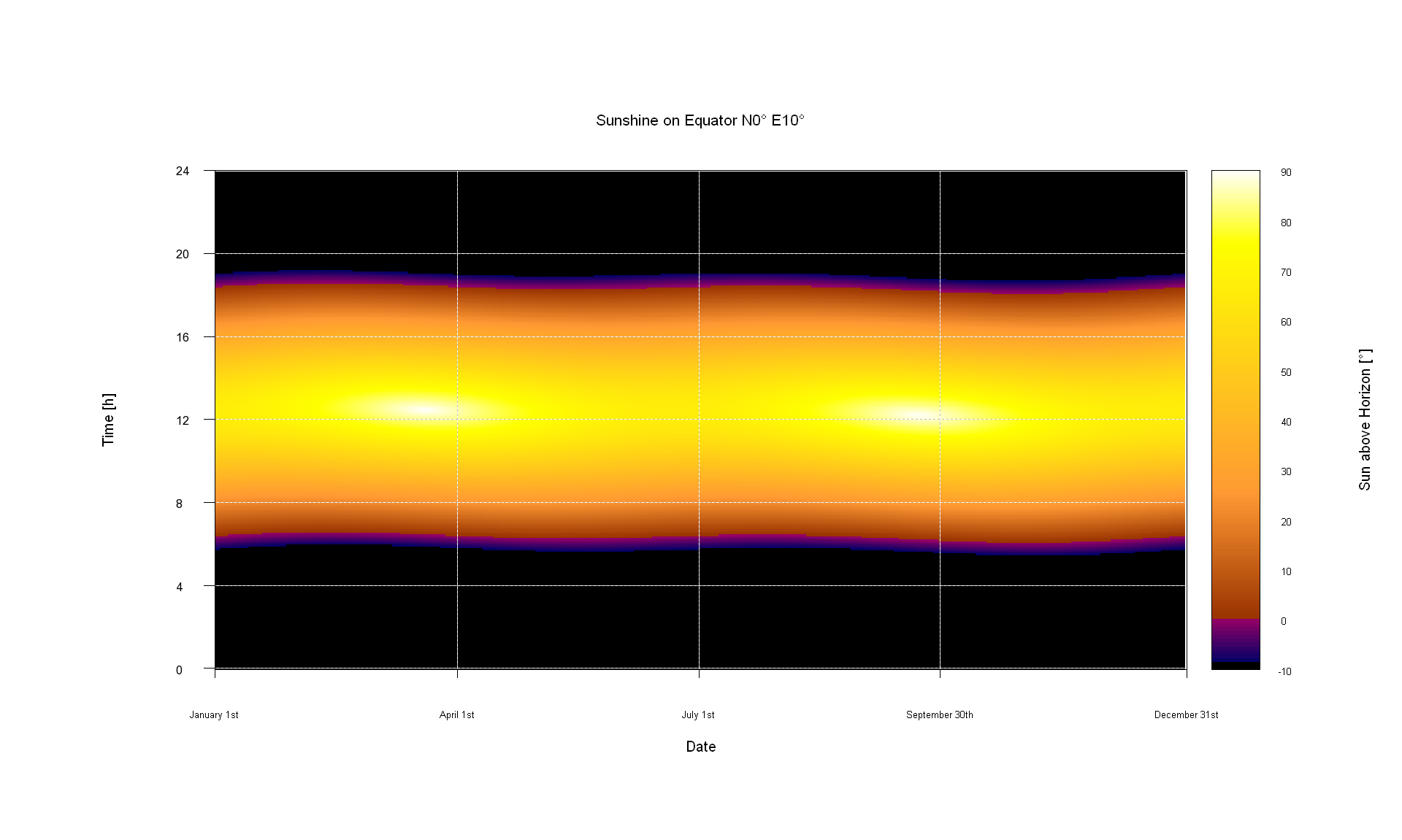
Carpet plot of sunshine at the equator

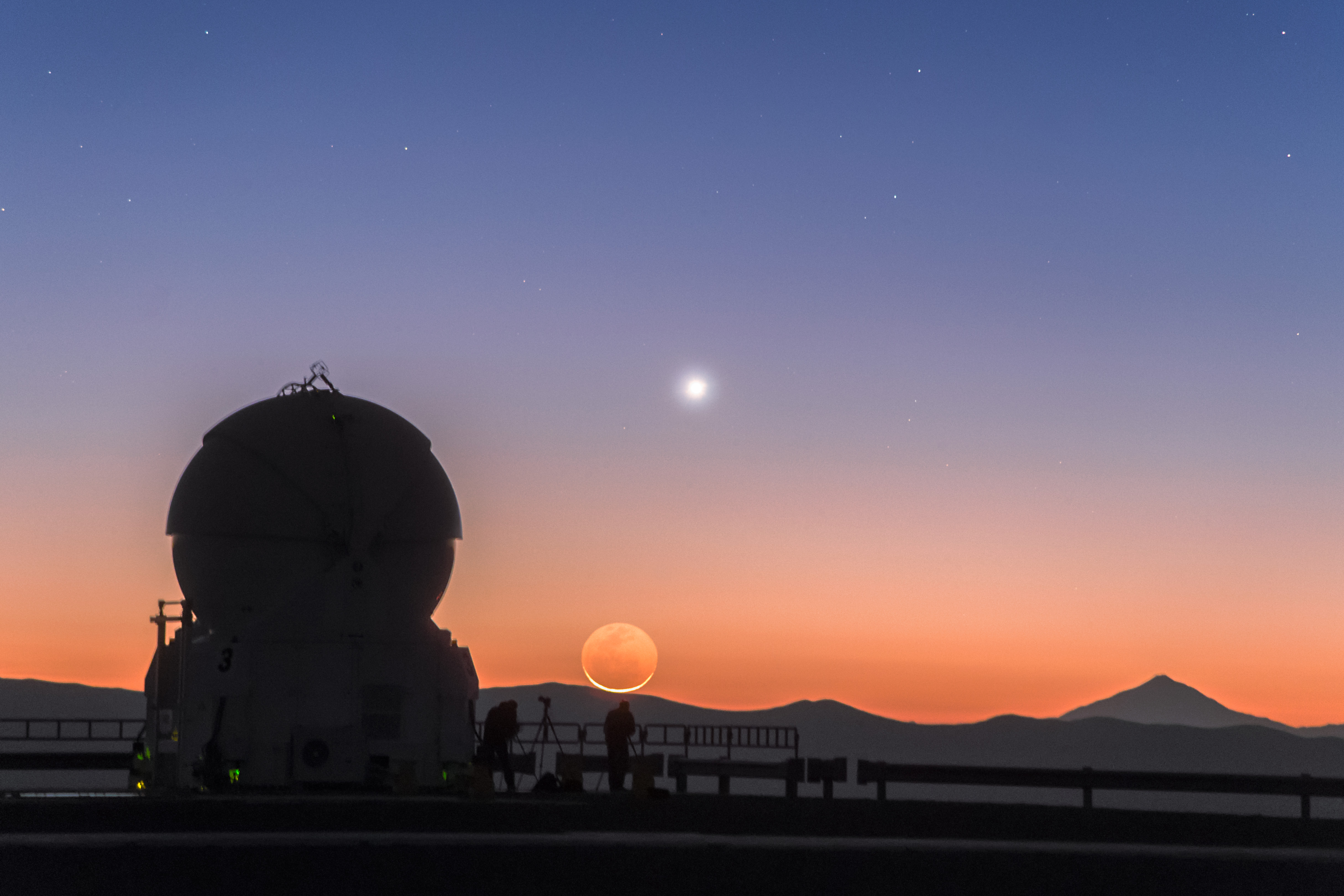
Twilight at Paranal Observatory in Chile

The duration of twilight depends on the latitude and the time of the year. The apparent travel of the Sun occurs at the rate of 15 degrees per hour (360° per day), but sunrise and sunset happen typically at oblique angles to the horizon and the actual duration of any twilight period will be a function of that angle, being longer for more oblique angles. This angle of the Sun's motion with respect to the horizon changes with latitude as well as the time of year (affecting the angle of the Earth's axis with respect to the Sun).

At Greenwich, England (51.5°N), the duration of civil twilight will vary from 33 minutes to 48 minutes, depending on the time of year. At the equator, civil twilight can last as little as 24 minutes. This is true because at low latitudes the Sun's apparent movement is perpendicular to the observer's horizon. But at the poles, civil twilight can be as long as 2–3 weeks. In the Arctic and Antarctic regions, twilight (if there is any) can last for several hours. There is no astronomical twilight at the poles near the winter solstice (for about 74 days at the North Pole and about 80 days at the South Pole). As one gets closer to the Arctic and Antarctic circles, the Sun's disk moves toward the observer's horizon at a lower angle. The observer's earthly location will pass through the various twilight zones less directly, taking more time.

Within the polar circles, twenty-four-hour daylight is encountered in summer, and in regions very close to the poles, twilight can last for weeks on the winter side of the equinoxes. Outside the polar circles, where the angular distance from the polar circle is less than the angle which defines twilight (see above), twilight can continue through local midnight near the summer solstice. The precise position of the polar circles, and the regions where twilight can continue through local midnight, varies slightly from year to year with Earth's axial tilt. The lowest latitudes at which the various twilights can continue through local midnight are approximately 60.561° (60°33′43″) for civil twilight, 54.561° (54°33′43″) for nautical twilight and 48.561° (48°33′43″) for astronomical twilight.

Lowest-latitude twilight observed at local midnight by month
| Month | Midnight Sun | Civil | Nautical | Astronomical |
|---|---|---|---|---|
| January | 66°00’36.0”S | 60°50’36.0”S | 54°50’36.0”S | 48°50’36.0”S |
| February | 70°57’19.5”S | 65°47’19.5”S | 59°47’19.5”S | 53°47’19.5”S |
| March (before equinox) | 80°36’07.0”S | 75°26’07.0”S | 69°26’07.0”S | 63°26’07.0”S |
| March (after equinox) | 84º55’53.0”N | 79º45’53.0”N | 73º45’53.0”N | 67º45’53.0”N |
| April | 74°19’50.5”N | 69°09’50.5”N | 63°09’50.5”N | 57°09’50.5”N |
| May | 67°13’25.0”N | 62°03’25.0”N | 56°03’25.0”N | 50°03’25.0”N |
| June | 65°43’38.6”N | 60°33’38.6”N | 54°33’38.6”N | 48°33’38.6”N |
| July | 66°00’36.0”N | 60°50’36.0”N | 54°50’36.0”N | 48°50’36.0”N |
| August | 70°57’19.5”N | 65°47’19.5”N | 59°47’19.5”N | 53°47’19.5”N |
| September (before equinox) | 80°36’07.0”N | 75°26’07.0”N | 69°26’07.0”N | 63°26’07.0”N |
| September (after equinox) | 84º55’53.0”S | 79º45’53.0”S | 73º45’53.0”S | 67º45’53.0”S |
| October | 74°19’50.5”S | 69°09’50.5”S | 63°09’50.5”S | 57°09’50.5”S |
| November | 67°13’25.0”S | 62°03’25.0”S | 56°03’25.0”S | 50°03’25.0”S |
| December | 65°43’38.6”S | 60°33’38.6”S | 54°33’38.6”S | 48°33’38.6”S |

These are the largest cities of their respective countries where the various twilights can continue through local solar midnight:

- Civil twilight (or white night) from sunset to sunrise: Tampere, Oulu, Umeå, Trondheim, Tórshavn, Reykjavík, Nuuk, Whitehorse, Yellowknife, Anchorage, Fairbanks, Arkhangelsk, Yakutsk, and Baltasound. In the Southern Hemisphere, the only minor permanent settlement to experience this is Villa Las Estrellas, on the northern tip of the Antarctic Peninsula.
- Nautical twilight (or if brighter, white night) from civil dusk to civil dawn: Saint Petersburg, Moscow, Vitebsk, Vilnius, Riga, Tallinn, Wejherowo, Flensburg, Helsinki, Stockholm, Copenhagen, Oslo, Newcastle upon Tyne, Edinburgh, Glasgow, Belfast, Letterkenny, Petropavl, Nanortalik, Grande Prairie, Juneau, Ushuaia, and Puerto Williams.
- Astronomical twilight (or grey night) from nautical dusk to nautical dawn: Hulun Buir, Erdenet, Nur-Sultan, Samara, Kyiv, Minsk, Alytus, Warsaw, Košice, Paris, Dublin, Zwettl, Prague, Stanley (Falkland Islands), Berlin, Hamburg, Luxembourg City, Brussels, Amsterdam, London, Cardiff, Vancouver, Calgary, Edmonton, Unalaska, Bellingham (largest in the continental USA), Rio Gallegos, and Punta Arenas.
- Major cities that near astronomical twilight (or grey night) from nautical dusk to nautical dawn: Khabarovsk (48°29'0"N), Timmins (48°27'0"N), Dnipro (48°27'0"N), Victoria (48°25'42"N), Saguenay (48°25′0"N), Brest (48°23′26"N), Thunder Bay (48°22′56″N), Vienna (48°12′30″N), Bratislava (48°8′38″N), Munich (48°8'0"N), Seattle (47°36’35"N)

Although Helsinki, Oslo, Stockholm, Tallinn, and Saint Petersburg also enter into nautical twilight after sunset, they do have noticeably lighter skies at night during the summer solstice than other locations mentioned in their category above, because they do not go far into nautical twilight. A white night is a night with only civil twilight which lasts from sunset to sunrise.

At the winter solstice within the polar circle, twilight can extend through solar noon at latitudes below 72.561° (72°33′43″) for civil twilight, 78.561° (78°33′43″) for nautical twilight, and 84.561° (84°33′43″) for astronomical twilight.

== On other planets ==
Twilight on Mars is longer than on Earth, lasting for up to two hours before sunrise or after sunset. Dust high in the atmosphere scatters light to the night side of the planet. Similar twilights are seen on Earth following major volcanic eruptions.

== In culture ==
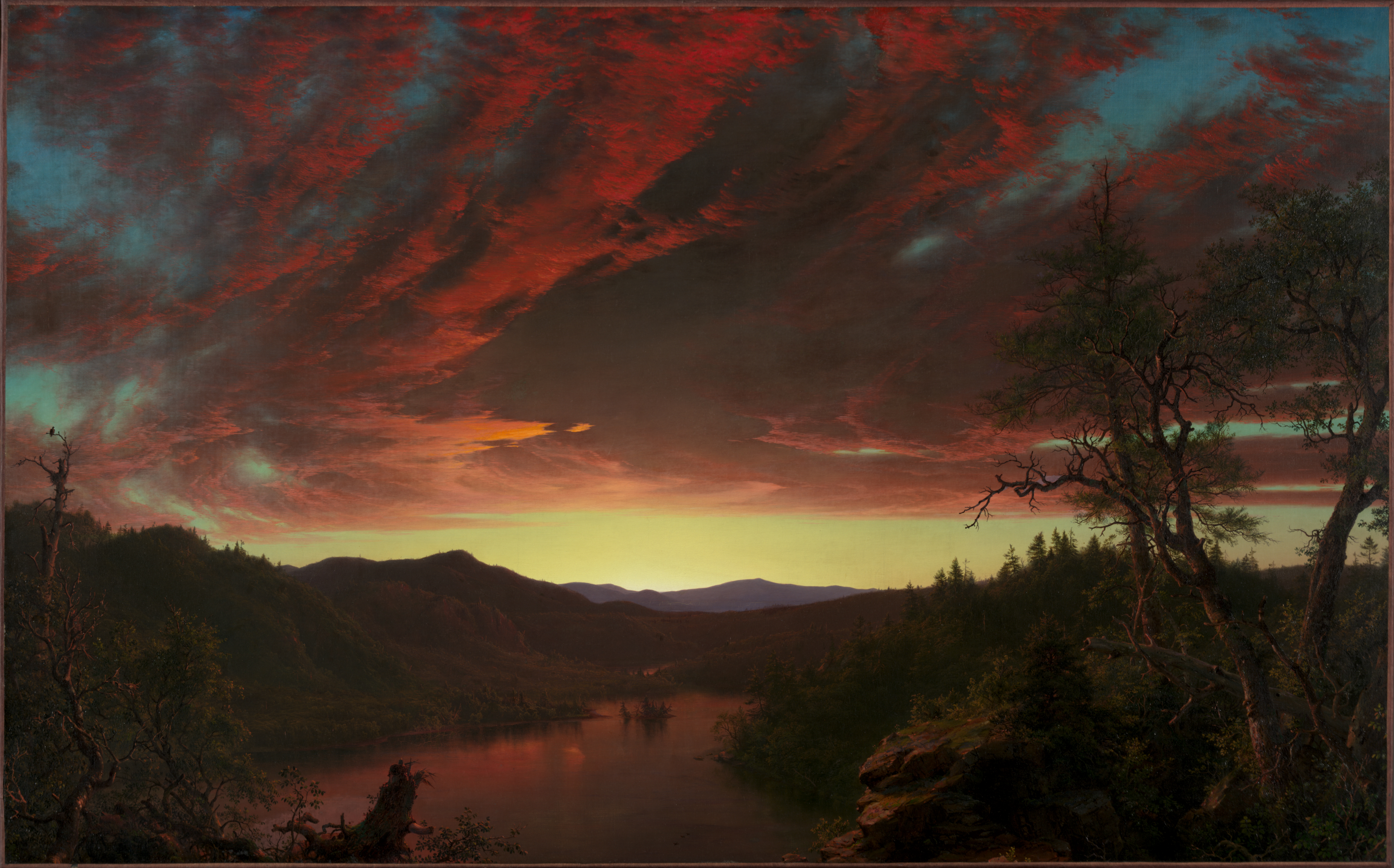
Twilight in the Wilderness by Frederic Edwin Church, a 19th century masterpiece of nature and landscape depiction.

=== Hinduism ===
Hinduism prescribes the observance of certain practices during twilight, a period generally called sandhya. The period is also called by the poetic form of gōdhūḷi in Sanskrit, literally 'cow dust', referring to the time cows returned from the fields after grazing, kicking up dust in the process. Many rituals, such as Sandhyavandanam and puja, are performed at the twilight hour. Consuming food is not advised during this time. According to some adherents, asuras are regarded to be active during these hours. One of the avatars of Vishnu, Narasimha, is closely associated with the twilight period. According to Hindu scriptures, an asura king, Hiranyakashipu, performed penance and obtained a boon from Brahma that he could not be killed during day or night, neither by human nor animal, neither inside his house nor outside. Vishnu appeared in a half-man half-lion form (neither human nor animal), and ended Hiranyakashipu's life at twilight (neither day nor night) while he was placed in the threshold of his house (neither inside nor outside).

=== Judaism ===
In Judaism, twilight is considered neither day nor night; consequently it is treated as a safeguard against encroachment upon either. It can be considered a liminal time. For example, the twilight of Friday is reckoned as Sabbath eve, and that of Saturday as Sabbath day; and the same rule applies to festival days.

== See also ==
- Afterglow
- Belt of Venus
- Blue hour
- Diffuse sky radiation
- Earth's shadow, visible at twilight
- Gloom
- Green flash
- Polar night
