= Comparison of OTP applications =

One-time password software applications

The following is a general comparison of OTP applications that are used to generate one-time passwords for two-factor authentication (2FA) systems using the time-based one-time password (TOTP), the HMAC-based one-time password (HOTP) algorithms or Mobile-OTP (mOTP), which is an older, open source, 2FA system for mobile phones that combines a user’s PIN, time and a per-device secret to generate OTPs. It also lists apps that support proprietary authentication methods, like those used by Steam or Yandex.

== Summary information ==
=== Standalone authenticator applications ===
The following is an overview of authenticator applications that operate independently and are not integrated into password managers.

Name	License	Operating system support	Browser integration	Delivery format
2fa	EUPL v1.2	Android	Unknown	Local installation with backup via Google Drive
2FAS	BUSL 1.1	Android, iOS, iPadOS, watchOS	Yes, autofill via browser extension connected to mobile app	Local installation with sync via iCloud or Google Drive
2FAuth	AGPLv3	Cross-platform web application	No	Local installation
2fast	GPLv3	Windows	Unknown	Local installation
Aegis Authenticator	GPLv3	Android	Unknown	Local installation with cloud sync
andOTP (unmaintained)	MIT	Android, iOS, Linux, macOS, Windows	Unknown	Local installation with cloud sync
Authenticator App by 2Stable	Proprietary / Freemium	iOS, iPadOS, macOS, watchOS, browser extension for Chrome, Edge, Firefox and more	Unknown	Local installation
Authy	Proprietary / Freeware	Android, iOS, iPadOS, watchOS. Dropped support for Linux, Mac and Windows	Unknown	Local installation
Bitwarden Authenticator	GPLv3	Android, iOS, iPadOS, visionOS	Unknown	Local installation with backup via iCloud or Google Drive
Authenticator	GPL-3.0-or-later	Linux	Unknown	Local installation
Duo Mobile	Proprietary / Freeware	Android, iOS, iPadOS, watchOS	Unknown	Local installation
Ente Auth	AGPLv3	Android, iOS, iPadOS, Linux, macOS, Windows	Unknown	Local installation with cloud sync
Epic Authenticator	Proprietary / Freeware	Android, iOS, iPadOS, watchOS	Unknown	Local installation
FreeOTP	Apache 2.0	Android, iOS, iPadOS	Unknown	Local installation
GAuth Authenticator	GPL	Web based app	No	Local installation or hosted web application
Google Authenticator	Proprietary / Freeware	Android, iOS, iPadOS, Blackberry, Wear OS	Unknown	Local installation with cloud sync
Hotpants	GPLv2	J2ME	Unknown	Local installation
IBM Verify	Proprietary / Freeware	Android, iOS, iPadOS	Unknown	Local installation
LastPass Authenticator	Proprietary	Android, iOS, iPadOS, watchOS	Yes, autofill via browser extension connected to mobile app	Local installation with cloud sync
Microsoft Authenticator	Proprietary	Android, iOS, iPadOS, visionOS	No	Local installation with cloud sync
OATH Toolkit	Libraries: LGPLv2 or later Tools: GPLv3 or later	Linux	No	Local installation
Open Authenticator	GPLv3	Android, iOS, iPadOS, Linux, macOS, Windows	No	Local installation
Proton Authenticator	GPL-3.0-or-later	Android, iOS, macOS, Windows, Linux	Unknown	Local installation with cloud sync
SAASPASS Authenticator	Proprietary	Android, iOS, iPadOS, watchOS, macOS	No	Local installation with cloud sync
Stratum	GPLv3	Android, Wear OS	Unknown	Local installation with cloud sync
Symantec VIP	Proprietary	Android, iOS, watchOS, macOS, Windows	Unknown	Local installation
Tessera	GPLv3	Symbian S60 5th Edition, initial support for desktop	Unknown	Local installation
Tokn	GPLv3	Android	Unknown	Local installation
TOTP ME	Apache 2.0	J2ME	Unknown	Local installation
Yandex Key	Proprietary	Android, iOS, iPadOS	Unknown	Local installation
Yubico Authenticator for Desktop	Proprietary	Linux, macOS, Windows	Unknown	Local installation
Yubico Authenticator for Mobile	Proprietary	Android, iOS	Unknown	Local installation

=== Combined authenticator and password manager applications ===
The following is an overview of password managers that include an integrated authenticator feature.

Name	License	Operating system support	Browser integration with OTP handling	Delivery format
1Password	Proprietary	Android, iOS, Linux, macOS, Windows	Unknown	Local installation with Cloud sync
Bitwarden	Server: AGPL-3.0-only; Clients: GPL-3.0-only; Freemium 2FA generation is a premium feature.	Android, iOS, Linux, macOS, Windows	Unknown	Local installation with Cloud sync
Dashlane	Proprietary	Android, iOS, Linux, macOS, Windows	Unknown	Local installation with Cloud sync
Enpass	Proprietary	Android, BlackBerry 10, iOS, Windows Store, Windows Phone, macOS, Windows, Linux	Unknown	Local installation with Cloud sync
Intuitive Password	Proprietary / Freemium	Android, iOS, Linux, macOS, Windows, Windows Phone	Unknown	Cloud-based
KeePassXC; KeePassDX	XC: GPL-2.0-only or GPL-3.0-only; DX: GPL-3.0-or-later	XC: Windows, Linux, macOS; DX: Android	KeePassXC Browser Extension for Firefox, Chrome, Edge, or compiled from source code.	Local installation, external sync
Keeper	Proprietary / Freemium	Android, iOS, Kindle, Linux, Nook, macOS, Windows, Windows Phone	Unknown	Local installation with Cloud sync
NordPass	Proprietary / Freemium	Android, iOS, macOS, Windows, Linux & browser extensions	Unknown	Local installation with Zero Knowledge Cloud sync
pass	GPL-2.0-or-later	Android, FreeBSD, Linux, macOS	Unknown	Local installation with git sync
Passwords (Apple)	Proprietary	iOS, iPadOS, macOS	Native: Safari; Via iCloud Passwords: Firefox, Chrome and Edge	Local installation with Cloud sync
Password Safe	Artistic-2.0	Android, iOS, Linux (beta), FreeBSD (beta), Windows, unofficial ports (macOS, Windows Phone)	Unknown	Local installation, optional file or cloud sync
Pleasant Password Server	Proprietary	Cross-platform (browser extension and mobile app)	Unknown	Local installation
Proton Pass	GPL-3.0-or-later	Android, iOS, macOS, Windows, Linux	Unknown	Cloud-based
RoboForm	Proprietary	Android, iOS, macOS, Windows	Unknown	Local installation with Cloud sync
SafeInCloud	Proprietary	Android, iOS, macOS, Windows	Unknown	Local installation with Cloud sync
SecureSafe	Proprietary	Android, iOS, macOS, Windows	Unknown	Local installation with Cloud sync, Web version

== Authenticated implementations ==
Implementation	Description	Online sync.	Operating system / Platform						Default	Non-default					Import methods		Export methods	
Implementation	Description	Online sync.	Windows	Mac	Linux	iOS	Android	Other	HOTP	Value length, d	Hash, H	Interval, T_{X}	Epoch, T_{0}	Other: Steam or mOTP	QR	JSON	QR	JSON
1Password	Cross-platform password manager	Yes	Yes	Yes	Yes	Yes	Yes	No	Unknown	No	Unknown	Unknown	Unknown	Unknown				
2FAS	Popular, feature rich open-source two-factor authenticator. No account required.	Online backup/sync via iCloud or Google Drive	Through browser extension connected to mobile app			Yes	Yes	No	Yes	Yes	Yes	Yes	No	No	Yes	Yes	No	Yes
2FAuth	An open-source PHP web based self-hosted OTP generator, designed for both mobile and desktop.	Yes, web based						No	Unknown	Yes	Yes	Yes	No	Steam				
2fast	Open-source two-factor authenticator. No account required. Available in Windows App Store.	No	Yes	No	No	No	No	No	Unknown	Unknown	Unknown	Unknown	Unknown	Unknown				
Aegis Authenticator	Free and open source app for Android to manage your 2-step verification tokens.	Automatic backup to a location of your choosing	No	No	No	No	Yes	No	Unknown	Yes	Yes	Yes	No	Steam	Yes	Yes	Yes	Yes
andOTP (unmaintained - json file handled by Aegis)	Open-source app for Android 4.4+. Compatible with Google Authenticator.	No	No	No	No	No	Yes	No	Unknown	No	No	Yes	No	No		Yes		Yes
Apple Keychain	Native password manager on Apple devices. Not on tvOS.	Yes	Yes	Yes	No	Yes	No	Apple Vision Pro	Unknown	Yes	Yes	Yes	Unknown	Unknown	Yes		The Setup URL (otpauth://) can be manually copied for each item from the edit screen of the Passwords app	
Authenticator	GNOME circle application. Free and Open Source, community-provided, but not shipped as part of GNOME's Core apps	No	No	No	Yes	No	No	Any desktop or mobile platform where GNOME can run	Yes	Yes	Yes	Yes	Yes	Steam	Yes	Yes	Yes	Yes
Authenticator App by 2Stable	Secure two-factor authentication app for iPhone, iPad, iPod, Apple Watch and Mac. Freemium app with max 2 accounts in the free version.	Yes	No	Yes	No	Yes	No	No	Unknown	Yes	Yes	Yes	Unknown	No				
Authy	By Twilio, from 2015, originally Authy. Previously available for Chrome.	Yes	Discontinued March 19, 2024			Yes	Yes	No	Unknown	Yes	No	No	No	No				
Bitwarden	Open Source Cross platform password manager. 2FA is a premium feature.	Yes	Yes	Yes	Yes	Yes	Yes	No	Unknown	Yes	Yes	Yes	Unknown	Steam	Yes	Yes	No	Yes
Bitwarden Authenticator	Free and open source app for Android and iOS to manage your 2-step verification tokens.	No	No	No	No	Yes	Yes	No	Unknown	No	No	No	No	No				
Duo Mobile	Free 2FA authenticator provided by Cisco	Yes, through iCloud or Google Drive	No	No	No	Yes	Yes	No	Unknown	Unknown	Unknown	Unknown	Unknown	No				
Enpass	Password manager by Sinew Software Systems. Syncs over multiple back-ends.	Yes	Yes	Yes	Yes	Yes	Yes	No	Unknown	Yes	No	Yes	Unknown	No	Yes			
Ente Auth	Free, open source, cross-platform authenticatior with encrypted cloud sync.	Yes	Yes	Yes	Yes	Yes	Yes	Web	Unknown	Unknown	Unknown	Unknown	Unknown	Steam				
FreeOTP	Maintained by RedHat, and based on Google Authenticator.	No	No	No	No	Yes	Yes	No	Unknown	Yes	Yes	Yes	No	No				
GAuth Authenticator	A simple application for multi-factor authentication, written in HTML using jQuery Mobile (and PhoneGap), jsSHA and LocalStorage.	Unknown	Yes	Yes	Yes	No	No	No	Unknown	Unknown	Unknown	Unknown	Unknown	Unknown				
Google Authenticator		Yes	No	No	No	Yes	Yes	No	Yes	No	No	No	No	No	Yes	No	Yes	No
Hotpants	Free, open-source J2ME MIDlet app to manage your TOTPs and HOTPs.	Import via scanning QR code on screen	No	No	No	No	No	J2ME	Yes	Unknown	Unknown	Unknown	Unknown	No				
IBM Security Verify		Unknown	No	No	No	Yes	Yes	No	Unknown	Unknown	Unknown	Yes	Unknown	Unknown				
Invantive Authenticator	Focuses on integration with Invantive Keychain.	No	Yes	No	No	No	No	No	Unknown	Yes	Yes	Yes	Yes	No				
KeePassXC	Password manager	Through user setup with Syncthing, or only within the KeeWeb online web App	Yes	Yes	Yes	No	KeePassDX	No	Unknown	Yes	Yes	Yes	No	Steam	Yes			
LastPass Authenticator	Cross-platform OTP for mobile devices with support for online backup.	Yes	No	No	No	Yes	Yes	No	Unknown	Yes	Yes	Yes	No	No	Yes			
Microsoft Authenticator		Yes	No	No	No	Yes	Yes	No	No	No	No	No	No	No	No	No	No	No
OATH Toolkit	Command-line tool for generating OTP tokens.	No	No	No	Yes	No	No	FreeBSD, NetBSD, OpenBSD	Unknown	Yes	Yes	Yes	Yes	Unknown				
Open Authenticator	Free, open-source and multiplatform app to manage your TOTPs.	Yes, requires a subscription for more than 6 TOTPs	Yes	Yes	Yes	Yes	Yes	No	No	Yes	Yes	Yes	No	No	Yes	No	Yes	No
privacyIDEA Authenticator	For use with privacyIDEA Authentication Server, with a secure enrollment process.	No	No	No	No	Yes	Yes	No	No	Yes	Yes	Yes	No	Unknown				
Proton Authenticator	Open source and available on every device. Securely sync and backup 2FA codes easily. No account required.	Yes, via a Proton Account, or via iCloud on Apple devices	Yes	Yes	Yes	Yes	Yes	No	No	Yes	Yes	Yes	No	Steam	Yes	Yes	No	Yes
SAASPASS Authenticator	Cross-platform 2FA Authenticator with TOTP & HOTP generator with sharing capabilities and password manager integration. Multiple device support, Mobile app and web access with multiple backup capabilities.	Yes	Yes	Yes	Yes	Yes	Yes	No	Yes	Yes	Yes	Yes	Yes	Steam				
Stratum	Free and open-source two-factor authentication app for Android	Unknown	No	No	No	No	Yes	WearOS	Yes	Unknown	Unknown	Unknown	Unknown	Steam & mOTP				
Symantec VIP		Unknown	No	No	No	Yes	Yes	No	Unknown	Unknown	Unknown	Unknown	Unknown	Unknown				
Tessera	Free, open-source Qt for Symbian and desktop app to manage your TOTPs.	Unknown	Initial support for desktop			No	Could be ported	Symbian S60 5th Edition	Unknown	Unknown	Unknown	Unknown	Unknown	Unknown				
Tokn	Free and open-source two-factor authentication app for Android	No	No	No	No	No	Yes	No	Yes	Unknown	Unknown	Unknown	Unknown	No	Yes	Yes	Yes	Yes
TOTP ME	Free, open-source J2ME MIDlet app to manage your TOTPs.	Manually	Using MicroEmulator app			Unknown	Using J2ME Loader app	J2ME or any with J2ME support or emulator	Unknown	Yes	Yes	Yes	Time correction in seconds	No				
Yandex Key	Simple app for phones from Russian company	Yes, manually, for 1 year	No	No	No	Yes	Yes	No	No	Unknown	Unknown	Unknown	Unknown	Unknown				
Yubico Authenticator for Desktop	By Yubico, for use with Yubikeys.	No	Yes	Yes	Yes	—N/a	—N/a	No	No	Yes	Yes	Yes	No	No				
Yubico Authenticator for Mobile	By Yubico, for use with Yubikeys.	No	—N/a	—N/a	—N/a	Yes	Yes	No	No	Yes	Yes	Yes	No	No				

== See also ==
- Password manager
- List of password managers
