= Offer Assistant =

Web-browser extension

- Developers: Billeo, Inc.
- Stable release: 2.1.1.12 / April 20, 2012; 13 years ago
- Operating system: Cross-platform
- Type: Password manager
- License: Proprietary software
- Website: www.billeo.com

Offer Assistant was a browser-based password, finance, and promotional offers manager for Internet Explorer and Firefox. It was certified by TRUSTe, VeriSign, and Softpedia. It was featured at Visa, Wells Fargo, Bank of America, Target, and Net spend. Offer Assistant was featured in PC Magazine with a four-star rating, as an Editor's Choice, and reviewed on Download.com, Make use of, Lifehacker, and Best Freeware Download.

== Awards ==
- Webby Award Nominee for Banking/Bill Paying website in the 2009 13th Annual Webby Awards
- The American Business Awards – Stevie Awards finalist in 2009 for Best ecommerce site
- Interactive Media Awards 2008 - Outstanding Achievement in Financial Services

== See also ==
- List of password managers
