= Intuitive Password =

Password management software

- Developer: Intuitive Security Systems Pty. Ltd.
- Platform: Firefox, Google Chrome, Internet Explorer 11, Microsoft Edge, Safari, Opera, Dolphin Browser, Android 4.4 and later, iOS 8 and later, Windows Phone 10 and later
- Available in: English, French, German, Italian, Spanish, Simplified Chinese, Traditional Chinese, Japanese, Romanian
- Type: Password manager
- License: Software as a Service (SaaS)
- Website: www.intuitivepassword.com

Intuitive Password is a proprietary freemium password manager and secure digital wallet that stores users' passwords and confidential data. It was launched in 2013 by the Australian company Intuitive Security Systems. Intuitive Password received mixed reviews.

Neil J. Rubeking wrote in PC Magazine in 2013 that one significant downside of Intuitive Password's was their lack of automated password capture, like some of their competitors.

== History ==
The program was developed by an Australian company, Intuitive Security Systems Pty. Ltd., and uses Advanced Encryption Standard-256. It was launched in mid-2013.

== Product ==
To create a free Intuitive Password account, users supply an email address, a master password, and a self-populated security question and answer. In the program's "Logins category", users can save website, database, and server logins. In the "Accounts category", users can store their credentials for email accounts, instant messaging accounts, and wireless routers. In the "Wallets" category, users can store their credit card information. In the "Licenses" category, users can store credentials for their software and hunting license. In the "Identifications" category, users can store IDs like library cards.

Intuitive Password lets clients use two kinds of two-factor authentication. The first factor is a master password. The second factor is either an authentication code sent through text message to a user's cellphone or Google Authenticator. It has configurable options to email users for every log in or to block different countries from logging in. Very confidential information can be protected by a second master password. Intuitive Password permits users to safely share authentication details with others who are using it. For logging in to public computers, users can generate a single-use password for authentication.

== Features ==
- AES-256 encryption
- Automatic logins and password capturing
- Password generator
- Security dashboard
- Two-factor authentication
- Auto logout
- Emergency access mode
- Custom folder management
- Offline access mode

== Reception ==
In a 2013 Softpedia review, Gabriela Vatu said Intuitive Password was "an easy-to-use app, with a clean interface and what looks like strong security in place to protect user data".

In a 2013 PC Magazine review, Neil J. Rubeking rated the program as "Fair" and wrote, "the lack of automated password capture and replay will be a deal-breaker for many users". In a 2015 PC Magazine review, Rubeking rated the program as "Good".

== See also ==
- Pleasant Password Server
- List of password managers
