= Enpass =

Password management software

- Developer: Enpass Technologies Inc.
- Operating system: Windows, Windows Phone, macOS, Linux, ChromeOS, iOS, Android, Wear OS, WatchOS
- Platform: Chrome, Safari, Edge, Firefox and Brave
- Type: Password manager
- License: Freemium
- Website: enpass.io

Enpass is a freemium password manager and passkey manager from Enpass Technologies, available for MacOS, Windows, iOS, Android and Linux, with browser extensions for all major browsers, and pricing plans for both personal use and business.

Enpass stores and syncs encrypted password vaults on users’ personal cloud accounts, or within a business's internal cloud infrastructure, rather than storing vault data on Enpass servers. The app is designed to comply with data sovereignty and data security regulations such as GDPR.

== Functionality ==
Enpass's features include:

- Multiple vaults and vault sharing
- Customizable categories, tags, templates, and data fields
- Customizable random password generation, and password history
- Biometric authentication
- Autofilling of login credentials, payment methods, and online forms
- Management of passkeys and two-factor authentication codes (TOTP)
- Password security auditing and breach monitoring
- On-device zero-knowledge encryption, using SQLCipher with a user-defined master password

Enpass vaults are usually stored on Google Drive, Box, Dropbox, OneDrive, iCloud, or on business's Microsoft 365 or Google Workspace storage. Enpass also supports self-hosted WebDAV solutions such as ownCloud and Nextcloud, as well as storing data on device and syncing via Wi-Fi or folder sync.

== Availability ==
Enpass is available in four editions: Personal, Family, Business, and Enterprise. The Business and Enterprise plans include administrative controls, identity provider integration, security audit tools, security event logging, access recovery, and password-less vault sharing between invited co-workers.

== Encryption ==
Enpass uses SQLCipher to encrypt the database with AES-256. The encryption key is derived from the user's master password using PBKDF2-HMAC-SHA512 with 320,000 iterations, which makes brute-force attacks extremely expensive.

Enpass provides security whitepapers that detail the security and encryption architecture.

== Security criticism ==
=== 2024 evaluation of password checkup tools ===
A 2024 study by Hutchinson et al. examined the "password checkup" features of 14 password managers, including Enpass, using weak, breached, and randomly generated passwords. The authors found that the evaluated products reported weak and compromised passwords inconsistently and sometimes incompletely. No manager successfully flagged all known breached passwords. The study concludes that such inconsistencies may give users a false sense of security.

=== 2025 DOM-based extension clickjacking ===
Security researcher Marek Tóth presented a vulnerability in browser extensions of several password managers, including Enpass, at DEF CON 33 on August 9, 2025. In their default configurations, these extensions were shown to be exposed to a DOM-based extension clickjacking technique, allowing attackers to exfiltrate user data with just a single click. The affected password manager vendors were notified in April 2025. According to Tóth, Enpass version 6.11.6 (released August 13, 2025) addressed this issue.

== See also ==
- List of password managers
