= Myki (password manager) =

Cross-platform password management software

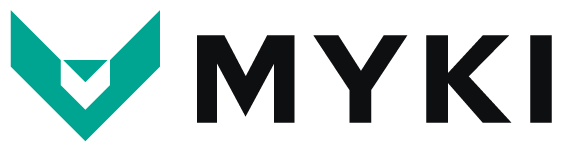
- Developer: Myki Security
- Initial release: 2016
- Stable release: 1.4.10 / March 2, 2022
- Operating system: Windows, macOS, Android, iOS, Linux, Arch Linux, Debian.
- Size: 94.4 MB
- Available in: English; Arabic; French; German; Italian; Portuguese; Spanish
- Type: Password manager, authenticator & MSP
- License: Proprietary software discontinued = yes
- Website: myki.co

Myki was a password manager and authenticator developed by Myki Security.

== Product overview ==
The Myki Password Manager and Authenticator was an offline (data stored on smartphone, not cloud) free mobile application for storing and managing passwords, credit cards, government IDs and notes.

Myki For Teams was an offline password manager for teams.

Myki for Managed Service Providers enables MSPs to manage the passwords of the multiple companies they administer.

It was available in English, Arabic, French, German, Italian, Portuguese and Spanish.

=== Availability ===
Myki was available on:

==== Operation systems ====
1. iOS (requires iOS10 or higher)
2. Android (requires Android 5 or higher)

==== Standalone apps ====
1. Windows (requires Windows 8 or higher)
2. macOS (requires MacOS 10.12 or higher)
3. Linux (App image &. snap)
4. Arch Linux (pacman)
5. Debian (.deb)

==== Browser extensions ====
1. Chrome
2. Firefox
3. Safari
4. Opera
5. Microsoft Edge

== History ==
Myki Security was founded in 2015 by Antoine Vincent Jebara and Priscilla Elora Sharuk.

Myki launched its product in a private beta in September 2016.

In 2016, Myki was the first MENA-based company selected to compete in TechCrunch Disrupt Battlefield in San Francisco, California.

In January 2017, Myki raised $1.2 million from BECO Capital in Dubai, United Arab Emirates, Leap Ventures and B&Y Venture Partners in Beirut, Lebanon.

Myki was named one of the Best Password Managers of 2018 globally by PC Magazine.

In 2019, Myki added a secure password-sharing feature, allowing users to share sensitive login credentials securely with trusted individuals, further differentiating it from other password managers in the market.

=== End of support ===
On 24 February 2022, it was reported that Jump Cloud, an American enterprise software company from Louisville, Colorado, acquired Myki Security.

In March 2022, Myki announced the discontinuation of all products by 10 April 2022, pushing a support library to help users to export their data from Myki before that day.

== See also ==
- List of password managers
