= KeeWeb =

Free and open-source password management software

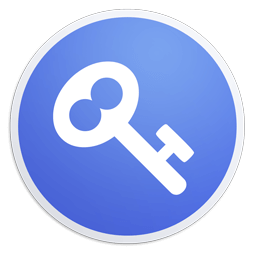

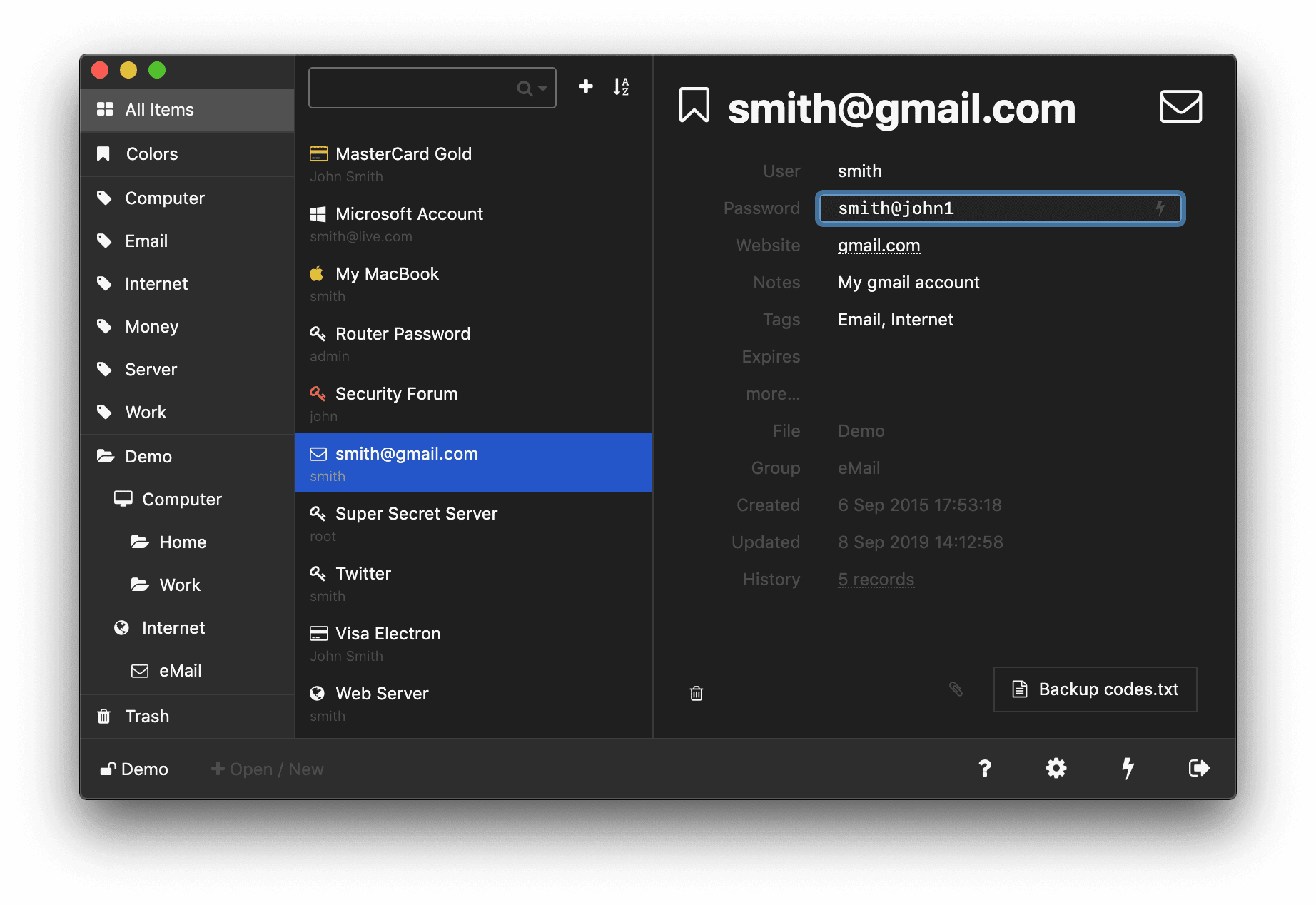
- Developer: Dimitri Witkowski
- Stable release: 1.18.7 / 18 July 2021; 4 years ago
- Written in: JavaScript
- Operating system: Cross-platform (Linux, macOS, Windows)
- Available in: English
- Type: Password manager
- License: MIT
- Website: keeweb.info
- Repository: github.com/keeweb/keeweb

KeeWeb is a free and open-source password manager compatible with KeePass, available as a web version and desktop apps. The underlying file format is KDBX (KeePass database file).

== Technology ==
KeeWeb is written in JavaScript and uses WebCrypto and WebAssembly to process password files in the browser, without uploading them to a server. It can synchronize files with popular file hosting services, such as Dropbox, Google Drive, and OneDrive.

KeeWeb is also available as an Electron bundle which resembles a desktop app. The desktop version adds some features not available on web:

- auto-typing passwords
- ability to open and save local files
- sync to WebDAV without CORS enabled

KeeWeb can also be deployed as a standalone server, or installed as a Nextcloud app.

== Reception ==
KeeWeb was praised by Ghacks Technology News in 2016 as "brand-new" fixing the "shortcoming of a web-based version" of KeePass, and by Tech Advisor in 2020 as "well-designed cross-platform password manager".

== See also ==
- List of password managers
