= LastPass =

Password management software

- Type: Private
- Industry: Password management; Computer security
- Genre: Password manager
- Founded: 2008; 18 years ago
- Headquarters: 125 High Street, Boston, Massachusetts, United States
- Key people: Karim Toubba, CEO (2022-Present)
- Revenue: $200 million (2021)
- Owners: GoTo (2015–2024); Francisco Partners (2024–); Elliott Investment Management (2024–)
- Number of employees: 800+ (2024)
- Website: lastpass.com

LastPass is a password manager application. The standard version of LastPass comes as a web interface, but also includes a browser extension, an app and support for bookmarklets.

Founded in 2008 by four developers, Lastpass was acquired by GoTo (formerly LogMeIn Inc.) for $110 million in 2015. LastPass was spun-off from GoTo into a stand-alone business in 2024.

LastPass is known for suffering significant security incidents between 2011 and 2022. Notably, in late 2022, user data, billing information, and vaults (with some fields encrypted and others not) (Note: URL encryption was added in 2024) were breached, leading many security professionals to call for users to change all their passwords and switch to other password managers.

== Overview ==
A user's content in LastPass, including passwords and secure notes, is protected by one master password. The content is synchronized to any device the user uses the LastPass software or app extensions on. Information is encrypted with AES-256 encryption with PBKDF2 SHA-256, salted hashes, and the ability to increase password iterations value. Encryption and decryption take place at the device level.

LastPass has a form filler that automates password entering and form filling, and it supports password generation, site sharing and site logging, and two-factor authentication. LastPass supports two-factor authentication via various methods including the LastPass Authenticator app for mobile phones as well as others including YubiKey.

Unlike some other major password managers, LastPass offers a user-set password hint, allowing access when the master password is missing.

== History ==
On December 2, 2010, it was announced that LastPass had acquired Xmarks, a web browser extension that enabled password synchronization between browsers. The acquisition meant the survival of Xmarks, which had financial troubles, and although the two services remained separate, the acquisition led to a reduced price for paid premium subscriptions combining the two services. On March 30, 2018, the Xmarks service was announced to be shut down on May 1, 2018, according to an email to LastPass users.

On October 9, 2015, GoTo acquired LastPass for $110 million. The company was combined under the LastPass brand with a similar product, Meldium, which had already been acquired by GoTo.

On March 16, 2016, LastPass released LastPass Authenticator, a free two-factor authentication app.

On November 2, 2016, LastPass announced that free accounts would now support synchronizing user content to any device, a feature previously exclusive to paid accounts. Earlier, a free account on the service meant it would sync content to only one app.

In August 2017, LastPass announced LastPass Families, a family plan for sharing passwords, bank account info, and other sensitive data among family members for a $48 annual subscription. They also doubled the price of the Premium version without adding any new features to it. Instead, some features of the free version were removed.

On December 14, 2021, GoTo announced that LastPass would be established as an independent company. The spin-off was completed in May 2024, with LastPass being directly controlled by Francisco Partners and Elliott Investment Management, the private equity firms that took GoTo private in 2020.

== Reception ==
In March 2009, PC Magazine awarded LastPass five stars, an "Excellent" mark, and their "Editors' Choice" for password management. A new review in 2016 following the release of LastPass 4.0 earned the service again five stars, an "Outstanding" mark, and "Editors' Choice" honor.

In July 2010, LastPass's security model was extensively covered and approved of by Steve Gibson in his Security Now podcast episode 256. He also revisited the subject and how it relates to the National Security Agency in Security Now podcast episode 421.

In October 2015 when GoTo acquired LastPass, founder Joe Siegrist's blog was filled with user comments voicing criticism of GoTo. Web sites ZDNet, Forbes and Infoworld posted articles mentioning the outcry by existing customers, some of whom said they would refuse to do business with GoTo, and raised other concerns about GoTo's reputation.

In a 2017 Consumer Reports article commented LastPass a popular password manager (alongside Dashlane, KeePass, and 1Password), with the choice between them mostly down to personal preference. In March 2019, Lastpass was awarded the Best Product in Identity Management award during the seventh annual Cyber Defense Magazine InfoSec Awards.

In 2017, Stiftung Warentest evaluated nine paid password managers and rated LastPass Premium as one of four recommended products. The test was later updated to include the 2022 LastPass breach.

== Security incidents ==
LastPass has faced ongoing scrutiny regarding its security practices and incident response over the years. Several independent analyses and reported breaches have raised concerns about how the company handles user data, mitigates vulnerabilities, and communicates risks to its customers. While LastPass employs industry-standard encryption to protect stored credentials, past security incidents and research findings have prompted debate over the platform’s overall reliability and its approach to safeguarding sensitive information.

=== 2011 security incident ===
In May 2011, LastPass reported detecting unusual network activity that indicated a possible intrusion into its servers. Although the company stated that no evidence of data exfiltration was found, it required all users to reset their master passwords as a precaution. According to LastPass, encrypted user vault data was not compromised.

=== 2015 security breach ===
In June 2015, the LastPass team discovered and halted suspicious activity on their network. Their investigation revealed that LastPass account email addresses, password reminders, server per user salts, and authentication hashes were compromised; however, encrypted user vault data was not affected.

=== 2017 security vulnerabilities in the Android app ===
A 2017 analysis by the Fraunhofer-Institut für Sichere Informationstechnologie (SIT) identified several security flaws in multiple Android password managers, including LastPass. The issues, which include improperly stored master passwords and Data leakage, were reported to the developers and subsequently fixed.

=== 2021 third-party trackers and security incident ===
In 2021, it was discovered that the Android app contained third-party trackers. At the end of 2021, LastPass warned users that their master passwords were compromised.

=== 2022 customer data and partially-encrypted vault theft ===
Two related security incidents were disclosed by the password manager LastPass in 2022. In the first incident, an attacker accessed parts of LastPass's development environment and exfiltrated source code repositories and technical documentation, including an encrypted copy of the key used to protect backups of customer data stored in Amazon S3.

In a second incident, a senior DevOps engineer's personal computer was compromised, and the attacker used a keystroke logger to obtain the employee's credentials and access an internal vault holding further keys. According to the UK Information Commissioner's Office (ICO), this enabled access to and exfiltration of a backup database and copies of some customers' password vault data, which included both unencrypted fields (such as some website URLs) and encrypted fields (such as usernames and passwords).

The breach prompted litigation and regulatory scrutiny, including a monetary penalty issued by the ICO in November 2025 against LastPass UK Ltd for failures to implement appropriate technical and organisational measures affecting over one million UK data subjects. The breach led to further incidents because stolen vault backups can be subjected to offline cracking attempts: in 2025 LastPass settled a class action lawsuit in the amount of $24.5 million for losses incurred by customers whose vaults had been accessed.

=== 2024 leakage via injection attacks ===
A 2024 study by Fábrega et al. demonstrated that many popular password managers are vulnerable to injection attacks. LastPass was affected due to its handling of application-wide security metrics, allowing an attacker to inject crafted shared entries and observe externally logged data (such as duplicate-password counts) to determine whether their injected values matched passwords stored in a victim’s vault.

=== 2024 evaluation of password checkup tools ===
A 2024 study by Hutchinson et al. examined the “password checkup” features of 14 password managers, including LastPass, using weak, breached, and randomly generated passwords. The authors found that the evaluated products reported weak and compromised passwords inconsistently and sometimes incompletely. No manager successfully flagged all known breached passwords. The study concludes that such inconsistencies may give users a false sense of security.

=== 2025 DOM-based extension clickjacking ===
Security researcher Marek Tóth presented a vulnerability in browser extensions of several password managers (including LastPass) at DEF CON 33 on August 9, 2025. In their default configurations, these extensions were shown to be exposed to a DOM-based extension clickjacking technique, allowing attackers to exfiltrate user data with just a single click. The affected password manager vendors were notified in April 2025. According to Tóth, LastPass version 4.146.8 (September 12, 2025), which was intended to address the issue, remains vulnerable.

=== 2026 ETH Zurich security analysis ===
In February 2026, researchers from the Applied Cryptography Group at ETH Zurich published a study revealing seven security vulnerabilities in LastPass. The research demonstrated that the platform's promised "zero-knowledge encryption" could be bypassed if the central server was compromised.

By simulating a malicious server threat model, the researchers showed that attackers could view and modify stored passwords during routine user interactions, such as logging into the account, opening the vault, or synchronizing data. The study attributed these vulnerabilities to a complex code architecture—expanded to accommodate user-friendly features like account recovery and family sharing; and the continued use of outdated cryptographic technologies.

=== 2026 Klue supply chain data breach ===
On June 12, 2026, LastPass, among other firms, fell victim to a supply chain attack, wherein the Icarus extortion group stole OAuth tokens from klue.com for LastPass' Klue integrations with internal Salesforce and Gong environments. The group stole customer details – such as phone numbers, email addresses, postal addresses and customer relationship management data – but not the password vaults, though subsequent phishing attacks could be launched using the stolen information.

== See also ==
- List of password managers
