= SecureSafe =

- Developer: DSwiss AG
- Initial release: 2008
- Operating system: Windows, macOS, Android, iOS, Web
- Type: Password manager, secrets manager, Online backup service
- License: Software as a Service (SaaS)
- Website: securesafe.com

SecureSafe is a cloud based software-as-a-service with a password safe, a document storage and digital spaces for online collaboration. The service is developed based on the principles of security by design and privacy by design.

== Data centers ==
SecureSafe stores customers’ data in three data centers using triple redundancy mirroring. The first data center is dedicated to production, the second is a hot standby and the third acts as the so-called disaster recovery center. The first two data centers are located in the greater area of Zürich at the company Interxion. The third center is located in a former military bunker in the mountains of central Switzerland.

== Features ==
- Password manager: A password manager is used to store passwords. The passwords that are stored in SecureSafe are protected by AES-256 and RSA-2048 encryption.
- File storage: A file storage or cloud storage is used to store files online.
- 2-factor authentication: The login method 2-factor authentication is also known from e-banking systems. It works by sending a one-time code to a user's mobile every time they log into a given online account. Even if a hacker should get to the user's login data, the information is useless without the additional security code.
- Data rooms: Data rooms are digital spaces where groups of people can share data online.
- Data inheritance: Data inheritance or digital inheritance enables customers to pass on important digital assets to others. Among the digital assets people pass on is login criteria to online accounts, insurance and legal documents and photo collections.

== See also ==
- List of password managers
