= SafeInCloud =

Passwords management software

- Operating system: Windows, macOS, iOS, Android, WatchOS, Wear OS
- Type: Password manager
- License: Proprietary
- Website: safe-in-cloud.com/en/

SafeInCloud is a proprietary password manager to securely store passwords and other credentials offline and in the cloud.

As of 2024 the App has more than 33900 Google Play Store Reviews and more than 1900 iOS App Store Ratings.

== Features ==
- One master password
- Everything is encrypted locally
- Cloud synchronization to Google Drive, Dropbox, OneDrive and WebDAV
- Cross browser and platform support
- Strong password generation
- Password encryption
- AutoFill Passwords with the help of browser extensions
- Portable access
- Export as XML, TXT and CSV
- Import of data from files in more than 50 different formats, including from all major competitors and major browsers
- The Password Checkup tool uses zxcvbn to assess password strength.
- It detects credential breaches by querying the Have I Been Pwned? database.

== Anti Features ==
- From the browser extensions document: "Attention: This extension requires SafeInCloud Password Manager application to be installed and running on your computer."
- Not available on ChromeOS. The Chrome browser extension does load (for example by means of browser extension sync). It cannot find the local installed application.
- Not available on Linux. The FireFox and Chormuim browsers show the extension if they are installed (for example by means of browser extension sync). They cannot find the local installed application.

== Reception ==
In 2019, Der Standard highlighted SafeInCloud to its readers as an effective tool for managing and organizing passwords.

== Security Criticism ==
=== 2024 Evaluation of Password Checkup Tools ===
A 2024 study by Hutchinson et al. examined the “password checkup” features of 14 password managers, including SafeInCloud, using weak, breached, and randomly generated passwords. The authors found that the evaluated products reported weak and compromised passwords inconsistently and sometimes incompletely. No manager successfully flagged all known breached passwords. The study concludes that such inconsistencies may give users a false sense of security.

== See also ==
- List of password managers
