= Form filler =

A form filler is a software program that fills forms in a UI. Form fillers can be part of a larger program, like a web browser, a web browser extension, password manager or even an enterprise single sign-on (E-SSO) solution.

A form filler is the opposite of a screen scraper, which extracts data from a form.

== Types ==
=== Web form fillers ===
Designed to complete HTML-based forms, such as login fields, shopping checkout pages, or online surveys like Google Forms. These are commonly built into web browsers, browser extensions, or password managers to streamline online data entry.
The earliest version of browser-based web form fillers were launched in the late 1990s including RoboForm (1999) developed by Siber Systems and Obongo (1999), a Sequoia Capital backed company, later acquired by America Online in 2001. These form fillers remembered and automatically filled user names, passwords, credit card information, addresses and other commonly filled personal information.

=== PDF form fillers ===
Specialized software for completing PDF forms. Government agencies, such as the IRS and State Department websites often refer to PDF-based documents simply as “forms.” Dedicated PDF form fillers can handle interactive fields, digital signatures, and validation requirements for official submissions.

== See also ==
- Enterprise single sign-on
- OpenID
- Password manager
