= Pass (software) =

Unix inspired password management software

pass
- Developer: Jason A. Donenfeld
- Release: September 4, 2012; 14 years ago
- Stable release: 1.7.4 / 11 June 2021
- Written in: Bash
- Operating system: FreeBSD, Linux, OpenBSD, OS X
- Available in: English
- Type: Password manager
- License: GPL-2.0-or-later
- Website: www.passwordstore.org
- Repository: git.zx2c4.com/password-store/tree/

pass is a password manager inspired by the Unix philosophy. It has a command-line interface, and uses GnuPG for encryption and decryption of stored passwords.

The passwords are encrypted and stored in separate files, and can be organized via the operating system's filesystem. A password file can contain additional text, such as the username, the email address, comments, or anything the user would like, since the password files are nothing more than encrypted text files.

There are several graphical user interfaces (GUIs) available, such as QtPass for Linux/Windows/MacOS or Password Store for Android operating systems. A syncing system is not implemented, but syncing can be achieved by using the Git version control system. The built in Git functionality also allows for automated version history tracking of the password store.

== Vulnerabilities ==
In June 2018, pass was found to be vulnerable to a variant of the SigSpoof attack. The issue was patched the same day that the vulnerability was disclosed.

== See also ==
- List of password managers
