= List of password managers =

The list below includes the names of notable of password managers with their Wikipedia articles.

== Summary information ==
Name	License	Operating system support	Browser integration	Delivery format
1Password	Proprietary	Android, iOS, Linux, macOS, Windows	Yes	Local installation with Cloud sync
Bitwarden	Server: AGPL-3.0-only; Clients: GPL-3.0-only	Android, iOS, Linux, macOS, Windows	Yes	Local installation with Cloud sync
Dashlane	Proprietary	Android, iOS, Linux, macOS, Windows	Yes	Local installation with Cloud sync
Enpass	Proprietary / Freemium	Android, BlackBerry 10, iOS, Windows Store, Windows Phone, macOS, Windows, Linux	Yes	Local installation with Cloud sync
Firefox Lockwise (deprecated)	MPL-2.0	Cross-platform (browser extension and mobile app)	Yes	Cloud-based
GNOME Keyring	GPL-2.0-or-later	Unix-like	Integration with GNOME Web and Chromium, through unofficial add-ons for Firefox	Local installation
Intuitive Password	Proprietary / Freemium	Android, iOS, Linux, macOS, Windows, Windows Phone	Yes	Cloud-based
KeePass	GPL-2.0-or-later	Windows, (unofficial ports: Android, iOS, Linux, macOS, Windows Phone)	Through auto-typing	Local installation, optional file or cloud sync
KeePassX (discontinued)	GPL-2.0-only or GPL-3.0-only	Windows, Linux, macOS	Through auto-typing	Local installation
KeePassDX	GPL-3.0-or-later	Android	Yes	Local installation, external sync
KeePassXC	GPL-2.0-only or GPL-3.0-only	Windows, Linux, macOS	Yes	Local installation, external sync
Keeper	Proprietary / Freemium	Android, iOS, Kindle, Linux, Nook, macOS, Windows, Windows Phone	Yes	Local installation with Cloud sync
KeeWeb	MIT	Windows, Linux, macOS, Web version	Through auto-typing	Local installation with Cloud sync, Web version
Keychain	APSL-2.0	Linux, iOS (as iCloud Keychain), macOS	in iCloud version	System utility
KWallet	LGPL	Unix-like	Integration with Konqueror and Chromium, through unofficial add-ons for Firefox	Local installation
LastPass	Proprietary / Freemium	Cross-platform (browser extension and mobile app)	Yes	Local installation with Cloud sync
Meldium (defunct)	Proprietary / Freemium	Cross-platform (browser extension and mobile app)	Yes	Cloud-based
Microsoft Autofill (discontinued)	Proprietary	Cross-platform (browser extension and mobile app)	Yes	Local installation with Cloud sync
Mitro (defunct)	GPL-3.0-only	Cross-platform (browser extension)	Yes	Cloud-based
Myki (discontinued by April 10, 2022)	Proprietary / Freemium	Cross-platform (browser extension and mobile app)	Yes	Local installation with Cloud sync
NordPass	Proprietary / Freemium	Android, iOS, macOS, Windows, Linux & browser extensions	Yes	Local installation with Zero Knowledge Cloud sync
oneID (defunct)	Proprietary / Freemium	Cross-platform (browser extension and mobile app)	Yes	Local installation with Cloud sync
pass	GPL-2.0-or-later	Android, FreeBSD, Linux, macOS	Through Firefox and Chromium add-ons	Local installation with git sync
Passwords (Apple)	Proprietary	iOS, iPadOS, macOS	Native: Safari; Via iCloud Passwords: Firefox, Chrome and Edge	Local installation with Cloud sync
Password Safe	Artistic-2.0	Android, iOS, Linux (beta), FreeBSD (beta), Windows, unofficial ports (macOS, Windows Phone)	Through auto-typing	Local installation, optional file or cloud sync
Pleasant Password Server	Proprietary	Cross-platform (browser extension and mobile app)	Yes	Local installation
Proton Pass	GPL-3.0-or-later	Android, iOS, macOS, Windows, Linux	Yes	Cloud-based
RoboForm	Proprietary	Android, iOS, macOS, Windows	Yes	Local installation with Cloud sync
SafeInCloud	Proprietary	Android, iOS, macOS, Windows	Yes	Local installation with Cloud sync
SecureSafe	Proprietary	Android, iOS, macOS, Windows	Yes	Local installation with Cloud sync, Web version
Yojimbo	Proprietary	macOS, iPadOS	No	Local installation with Cloud sync

== Features ==
Provider	Cost	Import from browsers	Import from competitors	Multi-factor authentication	Export data	Automatic password capture	Automatic password replay	Forms	Multiple form-filling identities	Actionable password strength report	Secure sharing	Digital legacy	Portable edition	Application passwords	Browser menu of logins	Application-level encryption	Secure password sharing
1Password	$3–5 (monthly)	Yes	Yes	Yes	Yes	Yes	Yes	Yes	Yes	Yes	Yes	Yes	Yes	Yes	Yes	Yes	Yes
Bitwarden	No cost or $19.80 (yearly)	Yes	Yes	Yes, 2FA protection on account is free. 2FA generation is a premium feature.	Yes	Yes	Yes	Yes	Yes	Yes	Yes	Yes	Yes	Yes	Yes	Yes	Yes
Dashlane	No cost or $4–6 (monthly)	Yes	Yes	Yes	Yes	Yes	Yes	Yes	Yes	Yes	Yes	Yes	Yes	Yes	Yes	Yes	Yes
Enpass	No cost or $24 (yearly)	Yes	Yes	Yes	Yes	Yes	No	Yes	Yes	Yes	Yes	Yes	Yes	Yes	Yes	Yes	Yes
GNOME Keyring	No cost	?	?	?	?	?	?	?	?	?	?	?	?	?	?	?	?
Intuitive Password	No cost or $2 (monthly)	Yes	Yes	Yes	Yes	Yes	Yes	Yes	Yes	Yes	Yes	Depends	Yes	Yes	Yes	Yes	Yes
KeePass	No cost	Yes	Yes	Yes (plugin)	Yes	Yes	Yes	Yes	Yes	Yes	Optional (requires add-on server)	Depends	Yes	Yes	Yes	Yes	?
KeePassDX	No cost	?	Yes	Yes (built-in)	Yes	?	?	Yes	?	?	?	?	?	Yes	Yes	Yes	?
KeePassXC	No cost	Yes	Yes	Yes (built-in)	Yes	Yes	Yes	Yes	Yes	Yes	No	Depends (external key share)	Yes	Yes	Yes	Yes	No
Keeper	No cost or $30 (yearly)	Yes	Yes	Yes	Yes	Yes	Yes	Yes	Yes	Yes	Yes	Yes	Yes	Yes	Yes	Yes	Yes
KeeWeb	No cost	No	Yes	No	Yes	Yes	Yes	Yes	Yes	No	Yes	Depends	Yes	Yes	Yes	Yes	?
KWallet	No cost	?	?	?	?	?	?	?	?	?	?	?	?	?	?	?	?
LastPass	No cost or $36 (yearly)	Yes	Yes	Yes	Yes	Yes	Yes	Yes	Yes	Yes	Yes	Yes	Yes	Yes	Yes	Yes	Yes
Microsoft Autofill	No cost	?	Yes	Yes	Yes	?	?	?	?	?	?	?	?	?	?	?	?
Myki (discontinued by April 10, 2022)	No cost	Yes	Yes	Yes	Yes	Yes	Yes	Yes	Depends	Yes	Yes	No	Yes	Yes	Yes	Yes	Yes
NordPass	No cost or $5 (monthly) or $36 (yearly)	Yes	Yes	Yes	Yes	Yes	Yes	Yes	Yes	Yes	Yes	No	No	No	Yes	Yes	Yes
Norton Password Manager	No cost	Yes	Yes	No	Yes	Yes	Yes	Yes	Yes	No	No	No	Yes (iOS – US only)	Yes	Yes	Yes	?
pass	No cost	Yes (third-party)	Yes (third-party)	Yes	Yes	Yes (third-party)	Yes (third-party)	Yes (third-party)	Yes	Yes (third-party)	Yes	Depends	Yes	Yes	Yes (third-party)	Yes	?
Passwords (Apple)	No cost	No	No	Yes	Yes	?	?	Yes	?	Yes	Yes	Yes	Yes	?	?	?	?
Password Safe	No cost	No	No	Yes	Yes	?	?	Yes	Yes	No	No	?	No	Yes	No	Yes	No
Pleasant Password Server	No cost or $10 (monthly)	Yes	Yes	Yes	Yes	Yes	Yes	Yes	Yes	Yes	Yes	Yes	Yes	Yes	Yes	Yes	?
Proton Pass	No cost or $4.99 (monthly) or $23.88 (yearly)	Yes	Yes	Yes, 2FA protection on account is free. 2FA generation is a premium feature.	Yes	Yes	Yes	Yes	Yes	Yes	Yes	No	No	Yes	Yes	Yes	Yes
RoboForm	No cost or $23.88 (yearly)	?	?	?	?	?	?	?	?	?	?	?	?	?	?	?	?
SafeInCloud	No cost or $29.99 (annual, individual) or $39.99 (annual, family sharing)	Yes	Yes	Yes	Yes	?	?	?	?	?	?	?	?	?	?	?	?
SecureSafe	No cost or $1.5 - 12 (monthly)	?	?	Yes	?	Yes	Yes	Yes	Yes	Yes	Yes	Yes	Yes	Yes	Yes	Yes	?

== See also ==
- Password fatigue
- Comparison of TOTP applications

== Bibliography ==
- Key, Kim (November 25, 2022). "The Best Password Managers for 2022". PC Magazine.
- Masiliauskas, Paulius (November 29, 2022). "Most secure password managers in 2022". Cyber News.
- Pogue, David (June 5, 2013). "Remember All Those Passwords? No Need". The New York Times.
