= 1Password =

Password management software

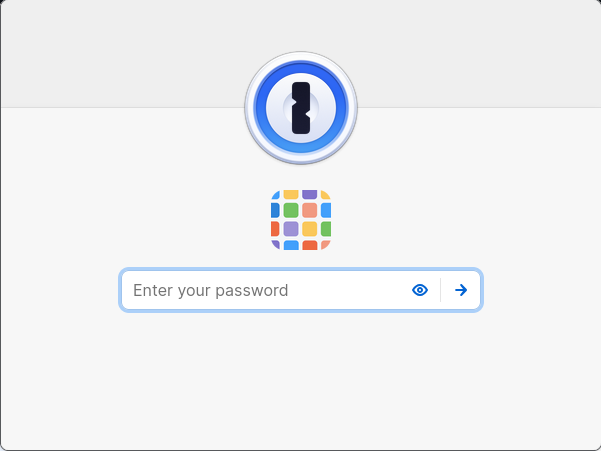
- Initial unlock dialog requiring user's account password
- Developer: 1Password Inc.
- Release: June 18, 2006

Stable release(s) [±]
- Windows: 8.12.36 / September 8, 2026; 2 months ago
- macOS: 8.12.36 / September 8, 2026; 2 months ago
- Linux: 8.12.36 / September 8, 2026; 2 months ago
- Android: 8.12.36 / September 8, 2026; 2 months ago
- iOS: 8.12.36 / September 8, 2026; 2 months ago
- Browser extension: 8.12.37 / September 11, 2026; 2 months ago
- CLI: 2.39.0 / August 14, 2026; 3 months ago
- SCIM Bridge: 2.9.16 / August 18, 2026; 2 months ago

Preview release(s) [±]
- Windows: 8.12.38-25 / September 9, 2026; 2 months ago
- macOS: 8.12.38-25 / September 9, 2026; 2 months ago
- Linux: 8.12.38-25 / September 9, 2026; 2 months ago
- Android: 8.12.38-25 / September 9, 2026; 2 months ago
- iOS: 8.12.38-25 / September 9, 2026; 2 months ago
- Browser extension: 8.12.38-26 / September 11, 2026; 2 months ago
- CLI: 2.39.1-beta.01 / August 13, 2026; 3 months ago
- Platform: Android, ChromeOS, iOS, Linux, macOS, Windows, WatchOS, and web browsers Chrome, Opera, Safari, Edge, Firefox and Brave
- Type: Password manager
- License: Software as a service
- Website: 1password.com
- As of: October 2021

1Password is a password manager developed by the Canadian software company AgileBits Inc. It supports multiple platforms such as iOS, Android, Windows, Linux, and macOS. It provides a place for users to store various passwords, software licenses, and other sensitive information in a virtual vault that is locked with a PBKDF2-guarded master password. By default, the user’s encrypted vault is hosted on 1Password’s servers for a monthly fee.

== Password file synchronisation ==
1Password can be configured through 1Password.com, a paid subscription-based server sync service maintained by the developers. Local Wi-Fi and iCloud sync were only available on iOS and macOS in previous versions.

In 2017, the Travel Mode feature was introduced for subscribers of 1Password.com, which enables the omission of password entries not tagged as safe for travel from the local storage on a particular device, reducing the impact of being obliged by officials to unlock access at the country border crossings.

== Browser extensions ==
1Password integrates with desktop web browsers including Safari, Chrome, Firefox, Edge, and Opera. The extension can remember logins for websites, fill in website logins automatically, and generate random passwords for new websites.

1Password also offers a standalone extension called 1Password X, available for Firefox, Chrome, and Opera. 1Password X is designed to work without a companion desktop app, but a 1Password.com subscription is required.

On the mobile side, 1Password offers integration with browsers and apps on iOS and Android devices using various methods.

== History ==
In 2016, Der Standard highlighted 1Password to its readers as an effective tool for managing and organizing passwords. In a 2017 Consumer Reports article, Dan Guido, the CEO of Trail of Bits, listed 1Password as a popular password manager (alongside Dashlane, KeePass, and LastPass), with the choice among them mostly up to personal preferences.

Unlike previous versions, 1Password 7 became a subscription service, though perpetual licenses were still available from within the app ($64.99 in 2018). The option to store password vaults locally was removed in 1Password 8, which drew criticism.

On November 14, 2019, 1Password announced a partnership with venture capital firm Accel, which invested $200 million in a Series A funding round and obtained a minority stake in the company. It was the first outside funding in 1Password's history, and the largest single investment Accel had made to date.

In 2021, 1Password acquired SecretHub, a Dutch cybersecurity company. It also raised $100 million in financing with a valuation of $2 billion.

In January 2022, 1Password raised a $620 million Series C round, the biggest funding round in Canadian history, led by Iconiq Growth, increasing the company's valuation to $6.8 billion. Notable individual investors that took part in this round were Ryan Reynolds, Robert Downey Jr., and Justin Timberlake.

In November 2022, 1Password announced its acquisition of Texas-based Passkey tool provider Passage for an undisclosed sum.

In September 2023, 1Password surpassed $250 million in annual recurring revenue where more than two-thirds of its revenue is generated from more than 100,000 business customers.

In February 2024, 1Password acquired the endpoint security platform Kolide for an undisclosed amount. Kolide's founder Jason Meller and its 30 employees joined the company.

After 13 years leading 1Password, Jeff Shiner moved from co-CEO to executive chair of the company's board and stepped back from day-to-day leadership. David Faugno, who had shared the co-CEO role with him, became sole CEO.

In November 2025, CEO David Faugno told CNBC that 1Password had surpassed $400 million in annual recurring revenue, and that the company was weighing a possible IPO in 2026 or 2027.

== Security incidents ==
=== 2017 Cloudbleed ===
In 2017, the Cloudflare infrastructure bug known as Cloudbleed raised concerns about potential data leakage affecting many major online services. 1Password stated that its users were not at risk, emphasizing that its data remained protected through end-to-end encryption and did not rely solely on TLS.

=== 2017 Security vulnerabilities in Android App ===
A 2017 analysis by the Fraunhofer-Institut für Sichere Informationstechnologie (SIT) identified several security flaws in multiple Android password managers, including 1Password. The issues, which include Password Leakage, Https downgrade to http URL Titles and URLs Not Encrypted in Database Read Private Data and Information Leaked were reported to the developers and subsequently fixed.

=== 2023 Okta Customer Service Breach ===
In October 2023, it was disclosed that 1Password was affected by a security incident involving Okta’s customer support system. According to 1Password, the suspicious activity was quickly contained, and no user, employee, or other sensitive data was compromised.

=== 2024 Evaluation of Password Checkup Tools ===
A 2024 study by Hutchinson et al. examined the “password checkup” features of 14 password managers, including 1Password, using weak, breached, and randomly generated passwords. The authors found that the evaluated products reported weak and compromised passwords inconsistently and sometimes incompletely. No manager successfully flagged all known breached passwords. The study concludes that such inconsistencies may give users a false sense of security.

=== 2025 DOM-based Extension Clickjacking ===
Security researcher Marek Tóth presented a vulnerability in browser extensions of several password managers (including 1Password) at DEF CON 33 on August 9, 2025. In their default configurations, these extensions were shown to be exposed to a DOM-based extension clickjacking technique, allowing attackers to exfiltrate user data with just a single click. The affected password manager vendors were notified in April 2025. According to Tóth, 1Password version 8.11.8.40 remains vulnerable.

== Controversy ==
In August 2026, 1Password became one of two initial "distinguished corporate patrons" of the Omacom Foundation, a non-profit overseeing the Omarchy Linux distribution created by David Heinemeier Hansson (DHH), pledging $300,000 over a three-year period. The announcement drew criticism from both customers and 1Password employees due to Hansson's blog posts, which have included calls for the deportation of Romani in Europe. Hansson's views had previously prompted Duke University Libraries to drop his company's product, Basecamp, in 2023. In an internal message to staff, CEO David Faugno stated that the contribution was directed to the Omacom Foundation rather than to an individual and did not constitute an endorsement of Hansson's personal views, while noting that Omarchy had become the second most-used Linux distribution among 1Password customers.

== See also ==
- List of password managers
