= KeePassXC =

Open-source password management software

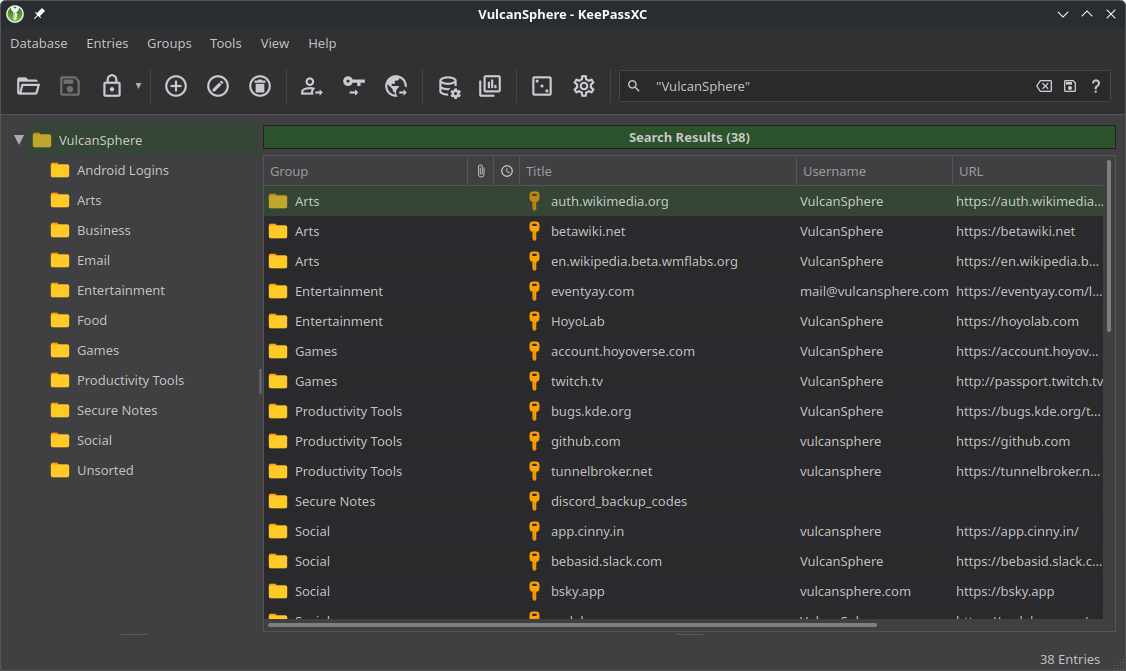
- KeePassXC 2.7.10 in Linux showing login entries
- Developer: KeePassXC Team
- Release: May 2, 2012; 14 years ago
- Stable release: 2.7.12 / 10 March 2026; 3 months ago
- Written in: C++
- Operating system: Windows; macOS; Linux
- Platform: x86-64, x86, Apple silicon, AArch64 and others
- Type: Password manager
- License: GPL 2.0 and 3.0
- Website: keepassxc.org
- Repository: github.com/keepassxreboot/keepassxc

KeePassXC (originally KeePassX) is a free and open-source cross-platform password manager. It is built using the Qt toolkit, which allows it to run on Linux, Windows, macOS, and BSD, unlike the original KeePass software.

KeePassXC uses the KeePass 2.x (.kdbx) password database format natively. It can also import (and convert) version 2 and the older KeePass 1 (.kdb) databases. KeePassXC supports having key files and YubiKey challenge-response for additional security.

The Electronic Frontier Foundation mentions KeePassXC as "easy-to-use [and] robust software". A security review of KeePassXC version 2.7.4 was completed in late 2022.

An accompanying browser extension is available for Firefox, Tor Browser, Google Chrome, Vivaldi, Microsoft Edge, and Chromium. Extensions can be linked by enabling browser integration in the desktop application.

KeePassXC uses zxcvbn to assess password strength and can search for credential breaches using Have I Been Pwned?.

== See also ==
- List of password managers
