= Pleasant Password Server =

Multi-user enterprise password server

Pleasant Password Server (also known as Keepass Hub)

- Pleasant Password Server Main Portal
- Developer: Pleasant Solutions Inc.
- Initial release: October 5, 2012
- Stable release: 9.1.12 / July 31, 2025; 7 months ago
- Written in: C#
- Operating system: Windows
- Platform: Cross-platform
- Available in: Multilingual
- Type: Password manager
- License: Proprietary software
- Website: www.pleasantpasswords.com; www.keepasshub.com

Pleasant Password Server (also known by its new name Keepass Hub) is a proprietary, multi-user enterprise password server that is the only multi-user server fully compatible with a modified version of the KeePass Password Safe.

== Features ==
Pleasant Password Server supports the use of secure passwords, allowing system administrators to manage user passwords from a central web interface.

Developed by Pleasant Solutions Inc., product pricing is based upon the number of software users licensed for the product, the length of product support as well as product upgrades.

=== Standard Edition ===
The standard server stores user passwords and login information using a secure database that is managed internally by the company. All versions of the software maintain a core feature set, including:

- Single Password: user names, passwords and website information are secured by single master password that is unique for each user.
- KeePass Compatibility: support for most KeePass plug-ins.
- A web client permits user access outside the company intranet, using any operating system.
- Multiple Language Extensions: over 40 language translations available for download.
- Automatic clipboard erase & random password generator for work teams.
- Ability to disable users when they have left the company, freezing further credential access.

=== Enterprise Edition ===
The Enterprise Edition includes additional features, primarily:

- Active Directory/LDAP Integration: Import, export and synchronization with existing LDAP databases.
- Customize or modify access and permissions granted to a user or role.
- View access and permissions granted to a user or role.
- Logging of when passwords were accessed, with export to .csv file.

Pleasant Solutions Inc. has also developed a password proxy module which prevents credentials from being stored on user devices, shielding enterprise passwords from users.

The password software extends to desktop and mobile environments, and is tested for compatibility with Chrome, Firefox, Internet Explorer, Opera, Android devices, iOS devices as well as other web browsers.

== See also ==
- List of password managers
