= Keeper (password manager) =

Password management software

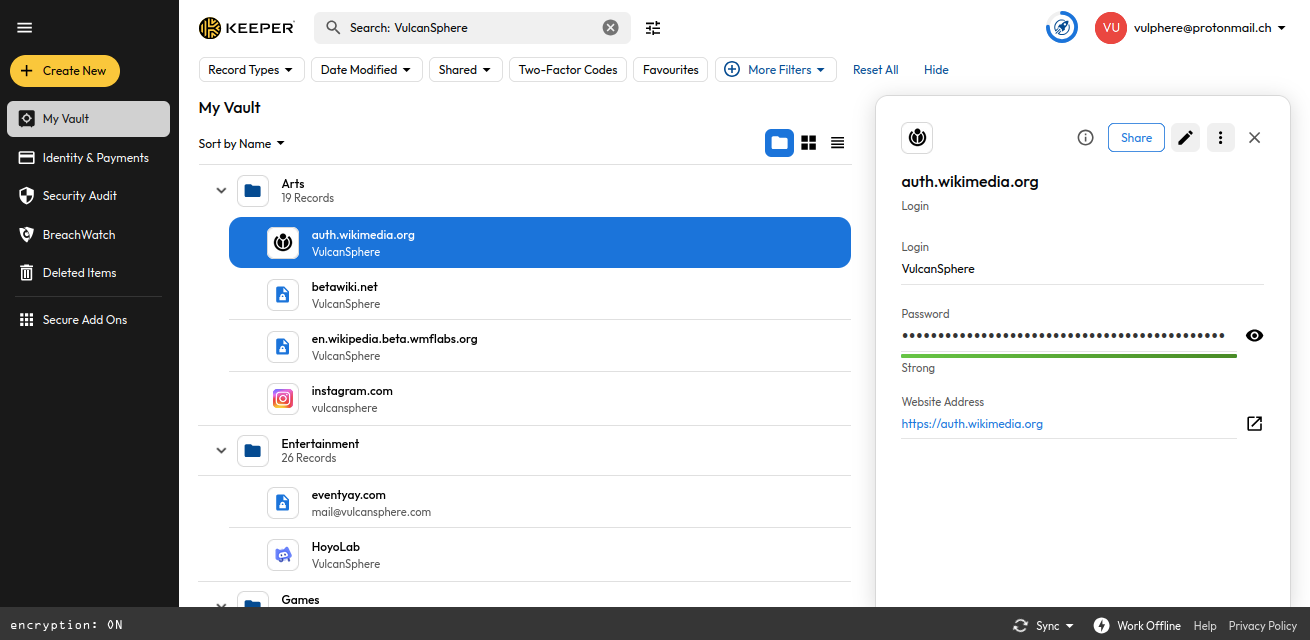
- Screenshot of Keeper Web Vault showing login records
- Developers: Keeper Security, Inc.
- Release: January 2009
- Operating system: Windows, Windows Phone, macOS, Linux, Android, iOS, Web, WatchOS, Wear OS
- Type: Password manager, secrets manager, agentless remote desktop gateway, privileged access manager
- License: Software as a Service (SaaS)
- Website: keepersecurity.com

Keeper Security, Inc. (Keeper) is a global cybersecurity company providing zero-knowledge security and encryption software covering functions such as password and passkey management, secrets management, privileged access management, secure remote access and encrypted messaging. It was founded in 2009 and is headquartered in Chicago, Illinois.

== History ==
In 2009, Craig Lurey developed the original Keeper app with Darren Guccione. In 2011, Lurey and Guccione officially co-founded Keeper Security, Inc. As of March 2022, Keeper had offices located in Chicago (US headquarters); El Dorado Hills, California (software development); Cork, Ireland (EMEA business sales); and Cebu, Philippines (international customer support).

In October 2019, Keeper launched KeeperMSP, a password management platform designed specifically for managed service providers (MSPs), managed security service providers (MSSPs), and their customers. In August 2020, Keeper received a $60 million minority investment from venture capital firm Insight Partners. In March 2021, Keeper launched Keeper SSO Connect. In January 2022, Keeper announced the launch of Keeper Secrets Manager.

In February 2022, Keeper acquired remote access gateway company Glyptodon Inc., creator of Glyptodon Enterprise and Apache Guacamole, and commenced integrating Glyptodon Enterprise into its product suite. In May 2022, Keeper launched Keeper Connection Manager, a rebranding and revamping of Glyptodon Enterprise into a commercial-grade remote desktop gateway designed for DevOps and IT teams.

In August 2022, Keeper Security was authorized on the FedRAMP Marketplace at the moderate impact level. In November 2022, Keeper Security was authorized on the StateRAMP Marketplace at the Moderate Impact Level.

As of 2023, Keeper Security has a software development office in El Dorado Hills, CA, an EMEA business sales office in Cork, Ireland, and an international customer support office in Cebu, Philippines in addition to its main headquarters in Chicago and APAC headquarters in Tokyo, Japan.

In June 2025, Keeper Security achieved their SOC 3 compliance.

== Software ==
Keeper offers a password manager that uses a freemium model for one device and a subscription-based model for households and businesses. Keeper provides storage for passwords and passkeys, identity data, and financial data, along with a password generator and two-factor authentication. The premium version offers unlimited storage on an unlimited number of devices, along with cross-device syncing and record-sharing.

Keeper Security developed and launched KeeperMSP, a password management system for managed service providers (MSPs) and managed security service providers (MSSPs). Keeper Security has also launched the Keeper Security Government Cloud, a FedRamp Authorized cybersecurity platform for government agencies.

In May 2023, Keeper launched KeeperPAM, a privileged access management suite that consolidates password management, secrets management, and agentless remote desktop connections into a single platform.

Keeper supports multifactor authentication methods such as Google Authenticator, Duo Security, FIDO U2F, hardware keys, and biometrics. Keeper’s encryption uses AES-256 keys combined with PBKDF2 encryption so that only encrypted cipher text is sent to Keeper’s servers.

Keeper also allows file-sharing using PKI encryption, including Keeper One-Time Share for sharing files with non-Keeper users.

In 2023, Keeper Security added passkey support for all desktop browsers. In the same year, Keeper Security added a Password Rotation feature that allows organizations to automatically change their credentials for various services. Additionally in 2023, Keeper Security partnered with Atera Networks to enhance joint cybersecurity efforts for managed service providers and professionals in information technology.

== Reception ==
In 2017, Stiftung Warentest evaluated paid password managers and identified Keeper as a recommended product. PC World awarded Keeper an Editor's Choice designation in 2019, while PCMag rated it among the top business password managers for several consecutive years.

== Security Criticism ==
In December 2017, Keeper was bundled with Windows 10 by Microsoft. Google security researcher Tavis Ormandy disclosed that the software recommended installing a browser addon which contained a vulnerability allowing any malicious website to steal any password. A nearly identical vulnerability was already previously discovered and disclosed to Keeper in 2016. Within 24 hours, the company issued a patch.

=== 2017 Security vulnerabilities in Android App ===
A 2017 analysis by the Fraunhofer-Institut für Sichere Informationstechnologie (SIT) identified several security flaws in multiple Android password managers, including Keeper. The issues, which include improperly stored Security Question Bypass and Data Injection without Master Password, were reported to the developers and subsequently fixed.

=== Reporting and lawsuit ===
Dan Goodin of Ars Technica appears to have been the first to report about the vulnerability in the press. Days later, the company that makes Keeper sued Goodin and Ars Technica, claiming their article was defamatory and misleading. A number of security experts decried the lawsuit as "bullying" or "ridiculous" and said that "the lawsuit will cause more damage to the company than the article" did. The lawsuit and Ars Technica's anti-SLAPP response lawsuit were dismissed on March 30, 2018, and Ars Technica added further clarifications to their article.

Following the lawsuit, Keeper launched a public vulnerability disclosure program in partnership with Bugcrowd.

=== 2024 Evaluation of Password Checkup Tools ===
A 2024 study by Hutchinson et al. examined the “password checkup” features of 14 password managers, including Keeper, using weak, breached, and randomly generated passwords. The authors found that the evaluated products reported weak and compromised passwords inconsistently and sometimes incompletely. No manager successfully flagged all known breached passwords. The study concludes that such inconsistencies may give users a false sense of security.

=== 2024 Leakage via Injection Attacks ===
A 2024 study by Fábrega et al. demonstrated that many popular password managers are vulnerable to injection attacks. Keeper was affected due to its handling of application-wide security metrics, allowing an attacker to inject crafted shared entries and observe externally logged data (such as duplicate-password counts) to determine whether their injected values matched passwords stored in a victim’s vault.

=== 2025 DOM-based Extension Clickjacking ===
Security researcher Marek Tóth presented a vulnerability in browser extensions of several password managers (including Keeper) at DEF CON 33 on August 9, 2025. In their default configurations, these extensions were shown to be exposed to a DOM-based extension clickjacking technique, allowing attackers to exfiltrate user data with just a single click. The affected password manager vendors were notified in April 2025. According to Tóth, Keeper version 17.2.0 (May 26, 2025) addressed the issue.

== See also ==
- List of password managers
