= LinOTP =

Linux-based authentication system

- Developer(s): KeyIdentity GmbH
- Initial release: March 1, 2010
- Stable release: 2.12.3 / April 7, 2021; 3 years ago
- Preview release: 3.0rc4 / March 18, 2021; 3 years ago
- Repository: github.com/LinOTP/LinOTP
- Written in: Python
- Operating system: Linux
- Available in: English, German
- Type: OTP Authentication server
- License: AGPLv3, GPLv2
- Website: www.linotp.org

LinOTP is Linux-based software to manage authentication devices for two-factor authentication with one time passwords. It is implemented as a web service based on the python framework Pylons. Thus it requires a web server to run in.

LinOTP is mainly developed by the German company KeyIdentity GmbH. Its core components are licensed under the Affero General Public License.

It is an open source authentication server certified by the OATH initiative for open authentication for its 2.4 version.

== Overview ==
As a web service, LinOTP provides a REST-like web API. All functions can be accessed via Pylons controllers. Responses are returned as a JSON object.

LinOTP is designed in a modular way, enabling user store modules and token modules. Thus, it is capable of supporting a wide range of different tokens.

== Project web site ==
linotp

== See also ==
- One-time password
- Tokens
- TOTP
- HOTP
- Multi-factor authentication
- OTPW
- privacyIDEA
- OPIE Authentication System
- Google Authenticator
- Pylons project
- Comparison of TOTP applications
