= PrivacyIDEA =

Two factor authentication software

privacyIDEA
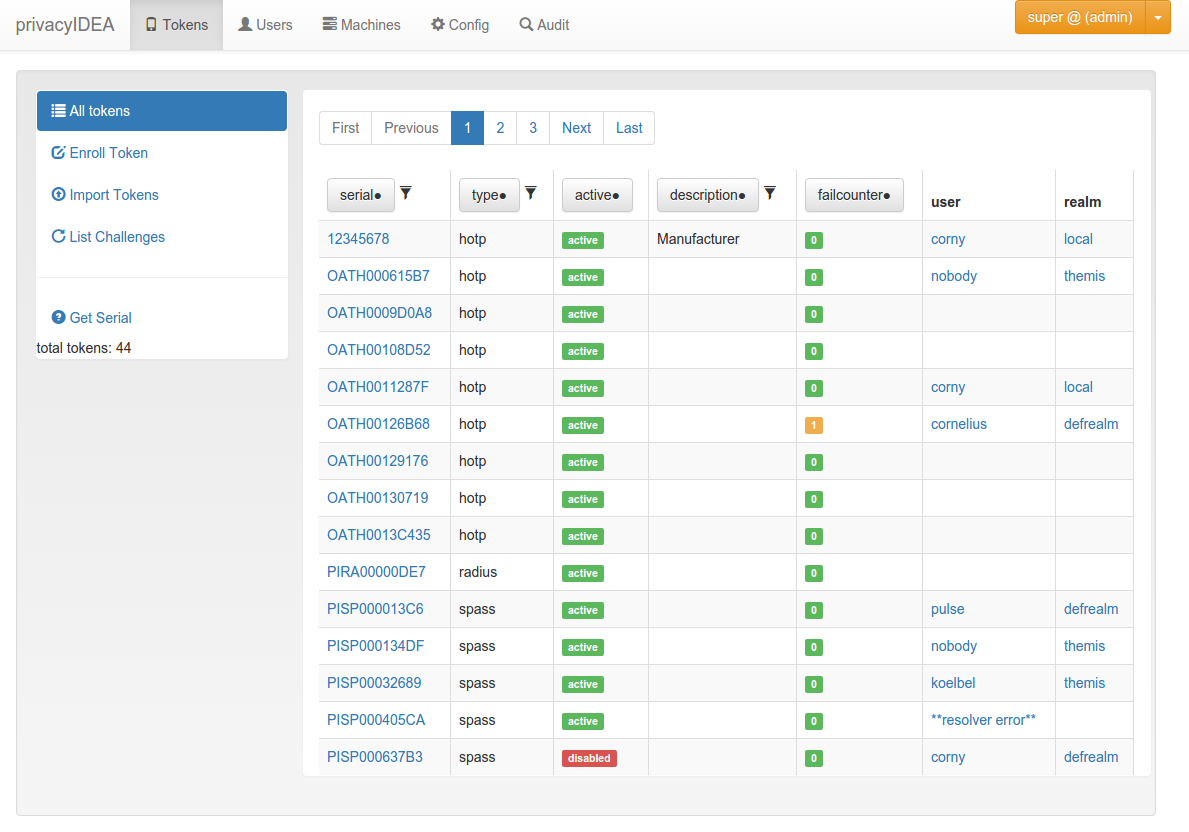
- View of authentication devices (tokens)
- Developer: privacyIDEA project / NetKnights GmbH
- Repository: github.com/privacyidea/privacyidea/
- Written in: Python
- Operating system: Linux
- Type: Two factor authentication
- License: AGPLv3
- Website: www.privacyIDEA.org

privacyIDEA is a two factor authentication system which is multi-tenency- and multi-instance-capable. It is open source, written in Python and hosted at GitHub. privacyIDEA is a LinOTP's fork from 2014.

== Fields of use ==
privacyIDEA provides an authentication backend for various kinds of applications (including SSH, VPN, as well as web applications such as ownCloud). Thus it is meant to replace classical proprietary two factor authentication systems such as RSA SecurID or Vasco. It supports single sign-on via SAML. It is also possible to login with a second factor to Windows desktops using a privacyIDEA Credential Provider.

== Installation ==
privacyIDEA runs on-premises as a web application on a Linux system. It can be set up quickly and easily. It can run on Debian, Ubuntu and RedHat.

== Authentication devices ==
privacyIDEA supports a wide variety of authentication devices. Amongst those are hardware tokens like Feitian C200, the Yubikey by Yubico or other U2F/WebAuthn devices. Many smartphone apps compliant with HOTP and TOTP are also supported.
