= Password =

Text used for user authentication to prove identity

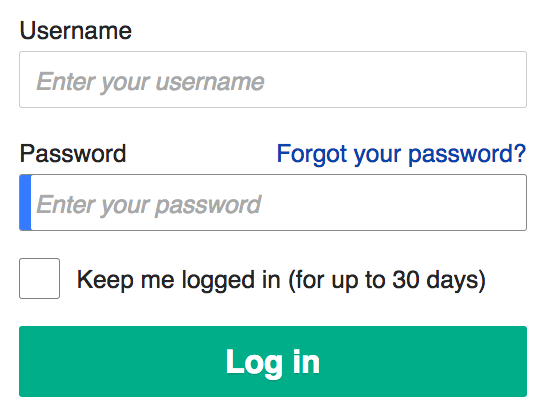
A password field in a sign-in form

A password, sometimes called a passcode, is secret data, typically a string of characters, usually used to confirm a user's identity. Traditionally, passwords were expected to be memorized, but the large number of password-protected services that a typical individual accesses can make memorization of unique passwords for each service impractical. Using the terminology of the NIST Digital Identity Guidelines, the secret is held by a party called the claimant while the party verifying the identity of the claimant is called the verifier. When the claimant successfully demonstrates knowledge of the password to the verifier through an established authentication protocol, the verifier can infer the claimant's identity.

In general, a password is a sequence of characters including letters, digits, or other symbols. If the permissible characters are constrained to be numeric, the corresponding secret is sometimes called a personal identification number (PIN).

Despite its name, a password does not need to be an actual word; indeed, a non-word (in the dictionary sense) may be harder to guess, which is a desirable property of passwords. A memorized secret consisting of a sequence of words or other text separated by spaces is sometimes called a passphrase. A passphrase is similar to a password in usage, but the former is generally longer for added security.

== History ==
Passwords have been used since ancient times. Sentries would challenge those wishing to enter an area to supply a password or watchword, and would only allow a person or group to pass if they knew the password. Polybius describes the system for the distribution of watchwords in the Roman military as follows:

The way in which they secure the passing round of the watchword for the night is as follows: from the tenth maniple of each class of infantry and cavalry, the maniple which is encamped at the lower end of the street, a man is chosen who is relieved from guard duty, and he attends every day at sunset at the tent of the tribune, and receiving from him the watchword—that is a wooden tablet with the word inscribed on it – takes his leave, and on returning to his quarters passes on the watchword and tablet before witnesses to the commander of the next maniple, who in turn passes it to the one next to him. All do the same until it reaches the first maniples, those encamped near the tents of the tribunes. These latter are obliged to deliver the tablet to the tribunes before dark. So that if all those issued are returned, the tribune knows that the watchword has been given to all the maniples, and has passed through all on its way back to him. If any one of them is missing, he makes inquiry at once, as he knows by the marks from what quarter the tablet has not returned, and whoever is responsible for the stoppage meets with the punishment he merits.

Passwords in military use evolved to include not just a password, but a password and a counterpassword; for example in the opening days of the Battle of Normandy, paratroopers of the U.S. 101st Airborne Division used a password—flash—which was presented as a challenge, and answered with the correct response—thunder. The challenge and response were changed every three days. American paratroopers also famously used a device known as a "cricket" on D-Day in place of a password system as a temporarily unique method of identification; one metallic click given by the device in lieu of a password was to be met by two clicks in reply.

Passwords have been used with computers since the earliest days of computing. The Compatible Time-Sharing System (CTSS), an operating system introduced at MIT in 1961, was the first computer system to implement password login. CTSS had a LOGIN command that requested a user password. "After typing PASSWORD, the system turns off the printing mechanism, if possible, so that the user may type in his password with privacy." In the early 1970s, Robert Morris developed a system of storing login passwords in a hashed form as part of the Unix operating system. The system was based on a simulated Hagelin rotor crypto machine, and first appeared in 6th Edition Unix in 1974. A later version of his algorithm, known as crypt(3), used a 12-bit salt and invoked a modified form of the DES algorithm 25 times to reduce the risk of pre-computed dictionary attacks.

In modern times, user names and passwords are commonly used by people during a log in process that controls access to protected computer operating systems, mobile phones, cable TV decoders, automated teller machines (ATMs), etc. A typical computer user has passwords for multiple purposes: logging into accounts, retrieving e-mail, accessing applications, databases, networks, websites, and even reading the morning newspaper online.

== Choosing a secure and memorable password ==
Generally, the easier a password is for the owner to remember, the easier it is for an attacker to guess. However, passwords that are difficult to remember may also reduce the security of a system because (a) users might need to write down or electronically store the password, (b) users will need frequent password resets and (c) users are more likely to re-use the same password across different accounts. Similarly, the more stringent the password requirements, such as "have a mix of uppercase and lowercase letters and digits" or "change it monthly", the greater the degree to which users will subvert the system. Others argue longer passwords provide more security (e.g., entropy) than shorter passwords with a wide variety of characters.

In The Memorability and Security of Passwords, Jeff Yan et al. examine the effect of advice given to users about a good choice of password. They found that passwords based on thinking of a phrase and taking the first letter of each word are just as memorable as naively selected passwords, and just as hard to crack as randomly generated passwords.

Combining two or more unrelated words and altering some of the letters to special characters or numbers is another good method, but a single dictionary word is not. Having a personally designed algorithm for generating obscure passwords is another good method.

However, asking users to remember a password consisting of a "mix of uppercase and lowercase characters" is similar to asking them to remember a sequence of bits: hard to remember, and only a little bit harder to crack (e.g. only 128 times harder to crack for 7-letter passwords, less if the user simply capitalises one of the letters). Asking users to use "both letters and digits" will often lead to easy-to-guess substitutions such as 'E' → '3' and 'I' → '1', substitutions that are well known to attackers. Similarly typing the password one keyboard row higher is a common trick known to attackers.

In 2013, Google released a list of the most common password types, all of which are considered insecure because they are too easy to guess (especially after researching an individual on social media), which includes:

- The name of a pet, child, family member, or significant other
- Anniversary dates and birthdays
- Birthplace
- Name of a favorite holiday
- Something related to a favorite sports team
- The word "password"

== Alternatives to memorization ==
Traditional advice to memorize passwords and never write them down has become a challenge because of the sheer number of passwords users of computers and the internet are expected to maintain. One survey concluded that the average user has around 100 passwords. To manage the proliferation of passwords, some users employ the same password for multiple accounts, a dangerous practice since a data breach in one account could compromise the rest. Less risky alternatives include the use of password managers, single sign-on systems and simply keeping paper lists of less critical passwords. Such practices can reduce the number of passwords that must be memorized, such as the password manager's master password, to a more manageable number.

== Factors in the security of a password system ==
The security of a password-protected system depends on several factors. The overall system must be designed for sound security, with protection against computer viruses, man-in-the-middle attacks and the like. Physical security issues are also a concern, from deterring shoulder surfing to more sophisticated physical threats such as video cameras and keyboard sniffers. Passwords should be chosen so that they are hard for an attacker to guess and hard for an attacker to discover using any of the available automatic attack schemes.

Nowadays, it is a common practice for computer systems to hide passwords as they are typed. The purpose of this measure is to prevent bystanders from reading the password; however, some argue that this practice may lead to mistakes and stress, encouraging users to choose weak passwords. As an alternative, users should have the option to show or hide passwords as they type them.

Effective access control provisions may force extreme measures on criminals seeking to acquire a password or biometric token. Less extreme measures include extortion, rubber hose cryptanalysis, and side channel attack.

Some specific password management issues that must be considered when thinking about, choosing, and handling a password follow.

=== Rate at which an attacker can try guessed passwords ===
The rate at which an attacker can submit guessed passwords to the system is a key factor in determining system security. Some systems impose a time-out of several seconds after a small number (e.g., three) of failed password entry attempts, also known as throttling. In the absence of other vulnerabilities, such systems can be effectively secure with relatively simple passwords if they have been well chosen and are not easily guessed.

Many systems store a cryptographic hash of the password. If an attacker gets access to the file of hashed passwords guessing can be done offline, rapidly testing candidate passwords against the true password's hash value. In the example of a web server, an online attacker can guess only at the rate at which the server will respond, while an off-line attacker (who gains access to the file) can guess at a rate limited only by the hardware on which the attack is running and the strength of the algorithm used to create the hash.

Passwords that are used to generate cryptographic keys (e.g., for disk encryption or Wi-Fi security) can also be subjected to high-rate guessing, known as password cracking. Lists of common passwords are widely available and can make password attacks efficient. Security in such situations depends on using passwords or passphrases of adequate complexity, making such an attack computationally infeasible for the attacker. Some systems, such as PGP and Wi-Fi WPA, apply a computation-intensive hash to the password to slow such attacks, in a technique known as key stretching.

=== Limits on the number of password guesses ===
An alternative to limiting the rate at which an attacker can make guesses on a password is to limit the total number of guesses that can be made. The password can be disabled, requiring a reset, after a small number of consecutive bad guesses (say 5); and the user may be required to change the password after a larger cumulative number of bad guesses (say 30), to prevent an attacker from making an arbitrarily large number of bad guesses by interspersing them between good guesses made by the legitimate password owner. Attackers may conversely use knowledge of this mitigation to implement a denial of service attack against the user by intentionally locking the user out of their own device; this denial of service may open other avenues for the attacker to manipulate the situation to their advantage via social engineering.

=== Form of stored passwords ===
Passwords entered into certain computer systems are saved in plaintext, which means they are not encrypted or protected in any way. The system merely compares the password entered by the user with this unprotected list when they log in. This method is extremely dangerous because anyone who manages to access the password storage can see every user's password right away. That jeopardizes every account on the system. Additionally, accounts belonging to users who have reused their passwords on other websites or services may also be compromised, which could result in a much larger security breach.

More secure systems store each password in a cryptographically protected form, so access to the actual password will still be difficult for a snooper who gains internal access to the system, while validation of user access attempts remains possible. The most secure do not store passwords at all, but use a one-way derivation, such as a polynomial, modulus, or an advanced hash function. Roger Needham invented the now-common approach of storing only a "hashed" form of the plaintext password. When a user types in a password on such a system, the password handling software runs through a cryptographic hash algorithm, and if the hash value generated from the user's entry matches the hash stored in the password database, the user is permitted access. The hash value is created by applying a cryptographic hash function to a string consisting of the submitted password and, in multiple implementations, another value known as a salt. A salt prevents attackers from easily building a list of hash values for common passwords and prevents password cracking efforts from scaling across all users. MD5 and SHA1 are frequently used cryptographic hash functions, but they are not recommended for password hashing unless they are used as part of a larger construction such as in PBKDF2.

The stored data—sometimes called the "password verifier" or the "password hash"—is often stored in Modular Crypt Format or RFC 2307 hash format, sometimes in the /etc/passwd file or the /etc/shadow file.

The main storage methods for passwords are plain text, hashed, hashed and salted, and reversibly encrypted. If an attacker gains access to the password file, then if it is stored as plain text, no cracking is necessary. If it is hashed but not salted then it is vulnerable to rainbow table attacks (which are more efficient than cracking). If it is reversibly encrypted then if the attacker gets the decryption key along with the file no cracking is necessary, while if he fails to get the key cracking is not possible. Thus, of the common storage formats for passwords only when passwords have been salted and hashed is cracking both necessary and possible.

If a cryptographic hash function is well designed, it is computationally infeasible to reverse the function to recover a plaintext password. An attacker can, however, use widely available tools to attempt to guess the passwords. These tools work by hashing possible passwords and comparing the result of each guess to the actual password hashes. If the attacker finds a match, they know that their guess is the actual password for the associated user. Password cracking tools can operate by brute force (i.e. trying every possible combination of characters) or by hashing every word from a list; large lists of possible passwords in multiple languages are widely available on the Internet. The existence of password cracking tools allows attackers to easily recover poorly chosen passwords. In particular, attackers can quickly recover passwords that are short, dictionary words, simple variations on dictionary words, or that use easily guessable patterns. A modified version of the DES algorithm was used as the basis for the password hashing algorithm in early Unix systems. The crypt algorithm used a 12-bit salt value so that each user's hash was unique and iterated the DES algorithm 25 times to make the hash function slower, both measures intended to frustrate automated guessing attacks. The user's password was used as a key to encrypt a fixed value. More recent Unix or Unix-like systems (e.g., Linux or the various BSD systems) use more secure password hashing algorithms such as PBKDF2, bcrypt, and scrypt, which have large salts and an adjustable cost or number of iterations. A poorly designed hash function can make attacks feasible even if a strong password is chosen. LM hash is a widely deployed and insecure example.

=== Methods of verifying a password over a network ===
==== Simple transmission of the password ====
Passwords are vulnerable to interception (i.e., "snooping") while being transmitted to the authenticating machine or person. If the password is carried as electrical signals on unsecured physical wiring between the user access point and the central system controlling the password database, it is subject to snooping by wiretapping methods. If it is carried as packeted data over the Internet, anyone able to watch the packets containing the logon information can snoop with a low probability of detection.

Email is sometimes used to distribute passwords but this is generally an insecure method. Since most email is sent as plaintext, a message containing a password is readable without effort during transport by any eavesdropper. Further, the message will be stored as plaintext on at least two computers: the sender's and the recipient's. If it passes through intermediate systems during its travels, it will probably be stored on them as well, at least for some time, and may be copied to backup, cache or history files on any of these systems.

Using client-side encryption will only protect transmission from the mail handling system server to the client machine. Previous or subsequent relays of the email will not be protected and the email will probably be stored on multiple computers, certainly on the originating and receiving computers, most often in clear text.

==== Transmission through encrypted channels ====
The risk of interception of passwords sent over the Internet can be reduced by, among other approaches, using cryptographic protection. The most widely used is the Transport Layer Security (TLS, previously called SSL) feature built into most current Internet browsers. Most browsers alert the user of a TLS/SSL-protected exchange with a server by displaying a closed lock icon, or some other sign, when TLS is in use. There are several other techniques in use.

==== Hash-based challenge–response methods ====
There is a conflict between stored hashed-passwords and hash-based challenge–response authentication; the latter requires a client to prove to a server that they know what the shared secret (i.e., password) is, and to do this, the server must be able to obtain the shared secret from its stored form. On a number of systems (including Unix-type systems) doing remote authentication, the shared secret usually becomes the hashed form and has the serious limitation of exposing passwords to offline guessing attacks. In addition, when the hash is used as a shared secret, an attacker does not need the original password to authenticate remotely; they only need the hash.

==== Zero-knowledge password proofs ====
Rather than transmitting a password, or transmitting the hash of the password, password-authenticated key agreement systems can perform a zero-knowledge password proof, which proves knowledge of the password without exposing it.

Moving a step further, augmented systems for password-authenticated key agreement (e.g., AMP, B-SPEKE, PAK-Z, SRP-6) avoid both the conflict and limitation of hash-based methods. An augmented system allows a client to prove knowledge of the password to a server, where the server knows only a (not exactly) hashed password, and where the unhashed password is required to gain access.

=== Procedures for changing passwords ===
Usually, a system must provide a way to change a password, either because a user believes the current password has been (or might have been) compromised, or as a precautionary measure. If a new password is passed to the system in unencrypted form, security can be lost (e.g., via wiretapping) before the new password can even be installed in the password database and if the new password is given to a compromised employee, little is gained. Some websites include the user-selected password in an unencrypted confirmation e-mail message, with the obvious increased vulnerability.

Identity management systems are increasingly used to automate the issuance of replacements for lost passwords, a feature called self-service password reset. The user's identity is verified by asking questions and comparing the answers to ones previously stored (i.e., when the account was opened).

Some password reset questions ask for personal information that could be found on social media, such as mother's maiden name. As a result, some security experts recommend either making up one's own questions or giving false answers.

=== Password longevity ===
"Password aging" is a feature of some operating systems which forces users to change passwords frequently (e.g., quarterly, monthly or even more often). Such policies usually provoke user protest and foot-dragging at best and hostility at worst. There is often an increase in the number of people who note down the password and leave it where it can easily be found, as well as help desk calls to reset a forgotten password. Users may use simpler passwords or develop variation patterns on a consistent theme to keep their passwords memorable. Because of these issues, there is some debate as to whether password aging is effective. Changing a password will not prevent abuse in most cases, since the abuse would often be immediately noticeable. However, if someone may have had access to the password through some means, such as sharing a computer or breaching a different site, changing the password limits the window for abuse.

=== Number of users per password ===
Allotting separate passwords to each user of a system is preferable to having a single password shared by legitimate users of the system, certainly from a security viewpoint. This is partly because users are more willing to tell another person (who may not be authorized) a shared password than one exclusively for their use. Single passwords are also much less convenient to change because multiple people need to be told at the same time, and they make removal of a particular user's access more difficult, as for instance on graduation or resignation. Separate logins are also often used for accountability, for example to know who changed a piece of data.

=== Password security architecture ===
Common techniques used to improve the security of computer systems protected by a password include:

- Not displaying the password on the display screen as it is being entered or obscuring it as it is typed by using asterisks (*) or bullets (•).
- Allowing passwords of adequate length. (Some legacy operating systems, including early versions of Unix and Windows, limited passwords to an 8 character maximum, reducing security.)
- Requiring users to re-enter their password after a period of inactivity (a semi log-off policy).
- Enforcing a password policy to increase password strength and security.
  - Assigning randomly chosen passwords.
  - Requiring minimum password lengths.
  - Some systems require characters from various character classes in a password—for example, "must have at least one uppercase and at least one lowercase letter". However, all-lowercase passwords are more secure per keystroke than mixed capitalization passwords.
  - Employ a password blacklist to block the use of weak, easily guessed passwords
  - Providing an alternative to keyboard entry (e.g., spoken passwords, or biometric identifiers).
  - Requiring more than one authentication system, such as two-factor authentication (something a user has and something the user knows).
- Using encrypted tunnels or password-authenticated key agreement to prevent access to transmitted passwords via network attacks
- Limiting the number of allowed failures within a given time period (to prevent repeated password guessing). After the limit is reached, further attempts will fail (including correct password attempts) until the beginning of the next time period. However, this is vulnerable to a form of denial of service attack.
- Introducing a delay between password submission attempts to slow down automated password guessing programs.

Some of the more stringent policy enforcement measures can pose a risk of alienating users, possibly decreasing security as a result.

=== Password reuse ===
It is common practice amongst computer users to reuse the same password on multiple sites. This presents a substantial security risk, because an attacker needs to only compromise a single site in order to gain access to other sites the victim uses. This problem is exacerbated by also reusing usernames, and by websites requiring email logins, as it makes it easier for an attacker to track a single user across multiple sites. Password reuse can be avoided or minimized by using mnemonic techniques, writing passwords down on paper, or using a password manager.

It has been argued by Redmond researchers Dinei Florencio and Cormac Herley, together with Paul C. van Oorschot of Carleton University, Canada, that password reuse is inevitable, and that users should reuse passwords for low-security websites (which contain little personal data and no financial information, for example) and instead focus their efforts on remembering long, complex passwords for a few important accounts, such as bank accounts. Similar arguments were made by Forbes, to not change passwords as often as some "experts" advise, due to the same limitations in human memory.

A study conducted by Ofcom and published on April 2, 2026, found that 26% of online adults reuse passwords, and that 13% of those adults had had their social media or email accounts hacked.

=== Writing down passwords on paper ===
Historically, multiple security experts asked people to memorize their passwords: "Never write down a password". More recently, multiple security experts such as Bruce Schneier recommend that people use passwords that are too complicated to memorize, write them down on paper, and keep them in a wallet.

Password management software can also store passwords relatively safely, in an encrypted file sealed with a single master password.

=== After death ===
To facilitate estate administration, it is helpful for people to provide a mechanism for their passwords to be communicated to the persons who will administer their affairs in the event of their death. Should a record of accounts and passwords be prepared, care must be taken to ensure that the records are secure, to prevent theft or fraud.

=== Multi-factor authentication ===
Multi-factor authentication schemes combine passwords (as "knowledge factors") with one or more other means of authentication to make authentication more secure and less vulnerable to compromised passwords. For example, a simple two-factor login might send a text message, e-mail, automated phone call, or similar alert whenever a login attempt is made, possibly supplying a code that must be entered in addition to a password. More sophisticated factors include such things as hardware tokens and biometric security.

=== Password rotation ===
Password rotation is a policy that is commonly implemented with the goal of enhancing computer security. In 2019, Microsoft stated that the practice is "ancient and obsolete".

== Password rules ==
Most organizations specify a password policy that sets requirements for the composition and usage of passwords, typically dictating minimum length, required categories (e.g., upper and lower case, numbers, and special characters), and prohibited elements (e.g., use of one's own name, date of birth, address, telephone number). Some governments have national authentication frameworks that define requirements for user authentication to government services, including requirements for passwords.

Many websites enforce standard rules such as minimum and maximum length, but also frequently include composition rules such as featuring at least one capital letter and at least one number/symbol. These latter, more specific rules were largely based on a 2003 report by the National Institute of Standards and Technology (NIST), authored by Bill Burr. It originally proposed the practice of using numbers, obscure characters and capital letters and updating regularly. In a 2017 article in The Wall Street Journal, Burr reported he regrets these proposals and made a mistake when he recommended them.

According to a 2017 rewrite of this NIST report, a number of websites have rules that actually have the opposite effect on the security of their users. This includes complex composition rules as well as forced password changes after certain periods of time. While these rules have long been widespread, they have also long been seen as annoying and ineffective by both users and cybersecurity experts. The NIST recommends people use longer phrases as passwords (and advises websites to raise the maximum password length) instead of hard-to-remember passwords with "illusory complexity" such as "pA55w+rd". A user prevented from using the password "password" may, if required to include a number and uppercase letter, simply choose "Password1". Combined with forced periodic password changes, this can lead to passwords that are difficult to remember but easy to crack.

Paul Grassi, one of the 2017 NIST report's authors, further elaborated: "Everyone knows that an exclamation point is a 1, or an I, or the last character of a password. $ is an S or a 5. If we use these well-known tricks, we aren't fooling any adversary. We are simply fooling the database that stores passwords into thinking the user did something good."

Pieris Tsokkis and Eliana Stavrou were able to identify some bad password construction strategies through their research and development of a password generator tool. They came up with eight categories of password construction strategies based on exposed password lists, password cracking tools, and online reports citing the most used passwords. These categories include user-related information, keyboard combinations and patterns, placement strategy, word processing, substitution, capitalization, append dates, and a combination of the previous categories.

== Password cracking ==
Attempting to crack passwords by trying as many possibilities as time and money permit is a brute-force attack. A related method, rather more efficient in most cases, is a dictionary attack. In a dictionary attack, all words in one or more dictionaries are tested. Lists of common passwords are also typically tested.

Password strength is the likelihood that a password cannot be guessed or discovered, and varies with the attack algorithm used. Cryptologists and computer scientists often refer to the strength or 'hardness' in terms of entropy.

Passwords easily discovered are termed weak or vulnerable; passwords difficult or impossible to discover are considered strong. There are several programs available for password attack (or even auditing and recovery by systems personnel) such as L0phtCrack, John the Ripper, and Cain; some of which use password design vulnerabilities (as found in the Microsoft LANManager system) to increase efficiency. These programs are sometimes used by system administrators to detect weak passwords proposed by users.

Studies of production computer systems have consistently shown that a large fraction of all user-chosen passwords are readily guessed automatically. For example, Columbia University found 22% of user passwords could be recovered with little effort. According to Bruce Schneier, examining data from a 2006 phishing attack, 55% of MySpace passwords would be crackable in 8 hours using a commercially available Password Recovery Toolkit capable of testing 200,000 passwords per second in 2006. He also reported that the single most common password was password1, confirming yet again the general lack of informed care in choosing passwords among users. (He nevertheless maintained, based on these data, that the general quality of passwords has improved over the years—for example, average length was up to eight characters from under seven in previous surveys, and less than 4% were dictionary words.)

=== Incidents ===
- On 16 July 1998, CERT reported an incident where an attacker had found 186,126 encrypted passwords. At the time the attacker was discovered, 47,642 passwords had already been cracked.
- In September 2001, after the deaths of 658 of their 960 New York employees in the September 11 attacks, financial services firm Cantor Fitzgerald through Microsoft broke the passwords of deceased employees to gain access to files needed for servicing client accounts. Technicians used brute-force attacks, and interviewers contacted families to gather personalized information that might reduce the search time for weaker passwords.
- In December 2009, a major password breach of the Rockyou.com website occurred that led to the release of 32 million passwords. The hacker then leaked the full list of the 32 million passwords (with no other identifiable information) to the Internet. Passwords were stored in cleartext in the database and were extracted through a SQL injection vulnerability. The Imperva Application Defense Center (ADC) did an analysis on the strength of the passwords.
- In June 2011, NATO (North Atlantic Treaty Organization) experienced a security breach that led to the public release of first and last names, usernames, and passwords for more than 11,000 registered users of their e-bookshop. The data was leaked as part of Operation AntiSec, a movement that includes Anonymous, LulzSec, as well as other hacking groups and individuals. AntiSec aims to expose personal, sensitive, and restricted information to the world, using any means necessary.
- On 11 July 2011, Booz Allen Hamilton, a consulting firm that does work for the Pentagon, had their servers hacked by Anonymous and leaked the same day. "The leak, dubbed 'Military Meltdown Monday,' includes 90,000 logins of military personnel—including personnel from USCENTCOM, SOCOM, the Marine corps, various Air Force facilities, Homeland Security, State Department staff, and what looks like private sector contractors." These leaked passwords wound up being hashed in SHA1, and were later decrypted and analyzed by the ADC team at Imperva, revealing that even military personnel look for shortcuts and ways around the password requirements.
- On 5 June 2012, a security breach at LinkedIn resulted in 117 million stolen passwords and emails. Millions of the passwords were later posted on a Russian forum. A hacker named "Peace" later offered additional passwords for sale. LinkedIn undertook a mandatory reset of all compromised accounts.

== Alternatives to passwords for authentication ==
The multiple ways in which permanent or semi-permanent passwords can be compromised has prompted the development of other techniques. Some are inadequate in practice, and in any case few have become universally available for users seeking a more secure alternative. A 2012 paper examines why passwords have proved so hard to supplant (despite multiple predictions that they would soon be a thing of the past); in examining thirty representative proposed replacements with respect to security, usability and deployability they conclude "none even retains the full set of benefits that legacy passwords already provide."

- Single-use passwords. Having passwords that are only valid once makes a number of potential attacks ineffective. Most users find single-use passwords extremely inconvenient. They have, however, been widely implemented in personal online banking, where they are known as Transaction Authentication Numbers (TANs). As most home users only perform a small number of transactions each week, the single-use issue has not led to intolerable customer dissatisfaction in this case.
- Time-synchronized one-time passwords are similar in some ways to single-use passwords, but the value to be entered is displayed on a small (generally pocketable) item and changes every minute or so.
- Passwordless authentication in which a user can log in to a computer system without entering (and having to remember) a password or any other knowledge-based secret. In most common implementations users are asked to enter their public identifier (username, phone number, email address etc.) and then complete the authentication process by providing a secure proof of identity through a registered device or token. Most of implementations rely on public-key cryptography infrastructure where the public key is provided during registration to the authenticating service (remote server, application or website) while the private key is kept on a user's device (PC, smartphone or an external security token) and can be accessed only by providing a biometric signature or another authentication factor which is not knowledge-based.
- PassWindow one-time passwords are used as single-use passwords, but the dynamic characters to be entered are visible only when a user superimposes a unique printed visual key over a server-generated challenge image shown on the user's screen.
- Access controls based on public-key cryptography e.g. ssh. The necessary keys are usually too large to memorize (but see proposal Passmaze) and must be stored on a local computer, security token or portable memory device, such as a USB flash drive or even floppy disk. The private key may be stored on a cloud service provider, and activated by the use of a password or two-factor authentication.
- Biometric methods promise authentication based on unalterable personal characteristics, but as of 2008 have high error rates and require additional hardware to scan, for example, fingerprints, irises, etc. They have proven easy to spoof in some famous incidents testing commercially available systems, for example, the gummie fingerprint spoof demonstration, and, because these characteristics are unalterable, they cannot be changed if compromised; this is a highly important consideration in access control as a compromised access token is necessarily insecure.
- Single sign-on technology is claimed to eliminate the need for having multiple passwords. Such schemes do not relieve users and administrators from choosing reasonable single passwords, nor system designers or administrators from ensuring that private access control information passed among systems enabling single sign-on is secure against attack. As yet, no satisfactory standard has been developed.
- Envaulting technology is a password-free way to secure data on removable storage devices such as USB flash drives. Instead of user passwords, access control is based on the user's access to a network resource.
- Non-text-based passwords, such as graphical passwords or mouse-movement based passwords. Graphical passwords are an alternative means of authentication for log-in intended to be used in place of conventional password; they use images, graphics or colours instead of letters, digits or special characters. One system requires users to select a series of faces as a password, utilizing the human brain's ability to recall faces easily. In some implementations the user is required to pick from a series of images in the correct sequence to gain access. Another graphical password solution creates a one-time password using a randomly generated grid of images. Each time the user is required to authenticate, they look for the images that fit their pre-chosen categories and enter the randomly generated alphanumeric character that appears in the image to form the one-time password. So far, graphical passwords are promising, but are not widely used. Studies on this subject have been made to determine their usability in the real world. While some believe that graphical passwords would be harder to crack, others suggest that people will be just as likely to pick common images or sequences as they are to pick common passwords.
- 2D Key (2-Dimensional Key) is a 2D matrix-like key input method having the key styles of multiline passphrase, crossword, ASCII/Unicode art, with optional textual semantic noises, to create big password/key beyond 128 bits to realize the MePKC (Memorizable Public-Key Cryptography) using fully memorizable private key upon the current private key management technologies like encrypted private key, split private key, and roaming private key.
- Cognitive passwords use question and answer cue/response pairs to verify identity.

== Obsolescence ==
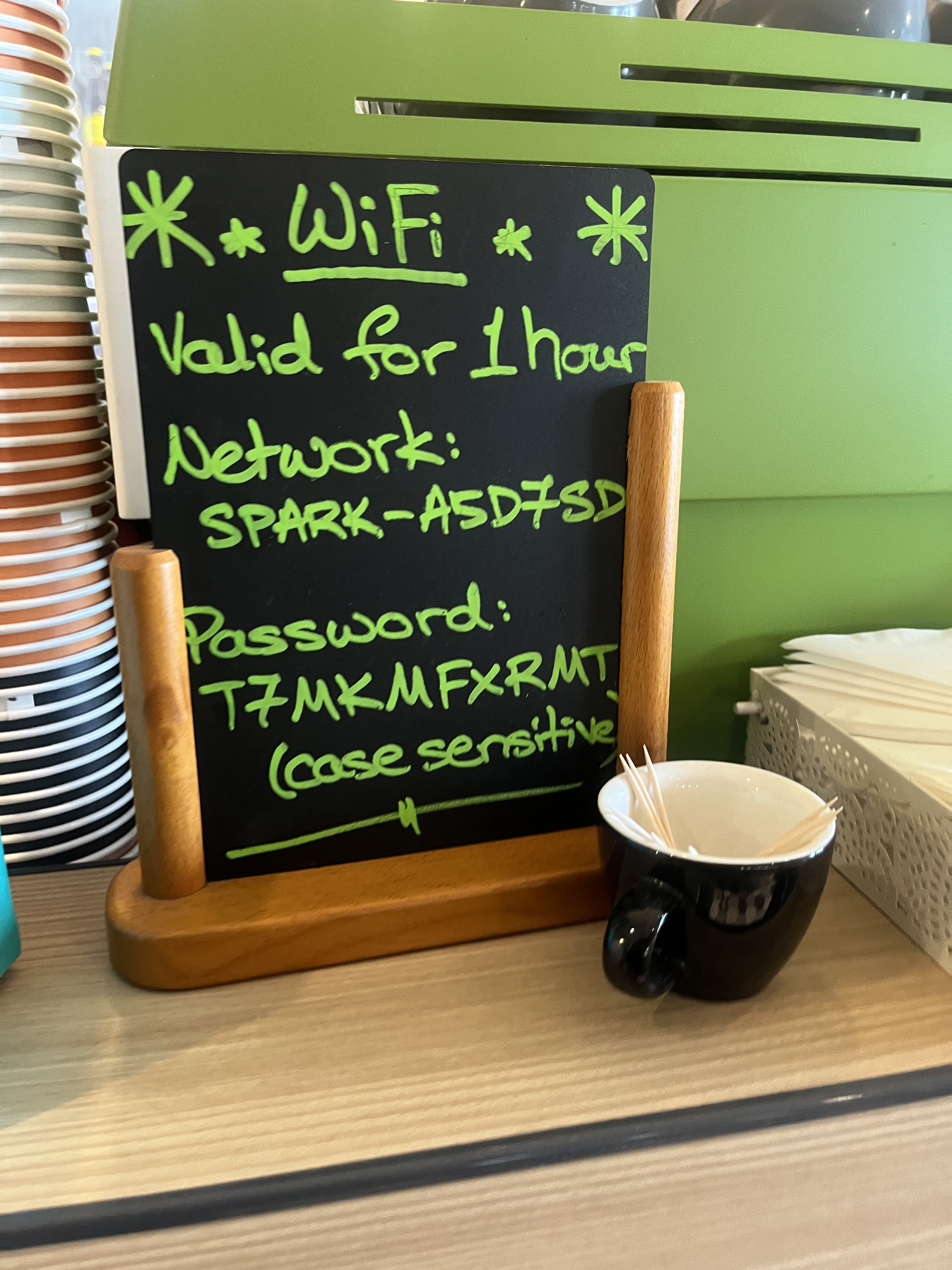
A password for a wi-fi network in a cafe in 2022

"The password is dead" is a recurring idea in computer security. The reasons given often include reference to the usability as well as security problems of passwords. It often accompanies arguments that the replacement of passwords by a more secure means of authentication is both necessary and imminent. This claim has been made by a number of people at least since 2004. Alternatives to passwords include biometrics, two-factor authentication or single sign-on, Microsoft's Cardspace, the Higgins project, the Liberty Alliance, NSTIC, the FIDO Alliance and various Identity 2.0 proposals.

Bonneau et al. systematically compared web passwords to other technical solutions that were alternatives. They reviewed these in respect of usability, deployability, and security. Their analysis showed that most alternatives do better than passwords on security, some do better and some worse with respect to usability, while every alternative does worse than passwords on deployability.

This may be why over 20 years after this recurring idea started, passwords are still being used, despite attempts by technology businesses to change this. Some that highlight this, suggest that the problem is generally not with the system of using passwords and is instead an issue with how humans use and manage their passwords and that "in the age of disparate workforces, home WiFi networks and multiple devices, password use has continued to increase".

== See also ==
- Access code (disambiguation)
- Combination lock
- Diceware
- Electronic lock
- Kerberos (protocol)
- Keyfile
- PassMap
- Password fatigue
- Password notification e-mail
- Password psychology
- Password synchronization
- Pre-shared key
- Random password generator
- Shibboleth
- Usability of web authentication systems
