= PassMap =

Authentication method

PassMap /ˈpæsmæp/ is a map-based graphical password method of authentication, similar to passwords, proposed by National Tsing Hua University researchers. The word PassMap originates from the word password by substituting word with map.

== History and usage ==
PassMap was proposed by National Tsing Hua University researchers Hung-Min Sun, Yao-Hsin Chen, Chiung-Cheng Fang, and Shih-Ying Chang at the 7th Association for Computing Machinery Symposium on Information, Computer and Communications Security. They defined PassMap as letting a consumer get authenticated by choosing a series of points on a big world map. Their study showed that for people, PassMap passwords are more user-friendly and memorable.

Users are shown Google Maps on their screen, through which they can zoom in to choose any two points they want to become their PassMap password. Since PassMap uses Google Maps, it cannot be used in applications that lack Internet access or Google Maps integration. By default, PassMap's screen is set to the eighth zoom level and is centered on Taiwan. PassMap has no constraints on the zoom level, so consumers are allowed to select dots at unsafer, lower levels, like level 8. It does not normalize error tolerance based on a screen's zoom position. PassMap's effective login percentage is 92.59%.

== Commentary ==
Ritika Sachdev wrote in the International Journal of Pure and Applied Research in Engineering and Technology that based on psychological studies, people can effortlessly recall the milestones they have visited. Sachdev called PassMap a "highly subjective or customized based password to ensure security".

S. Rajarajan, M. Prabhu, and S. Palanivel praised PassMap for having "good memorability due to the usage of map for the password mechanism". But they noted that, like many graphical passwords, PassMap is susceptible to a shoulder surfing intrusion.
