= Nitro =

Nitro may refer to:

== Chemistry ==
- Nitrogen, a chemical element and a gas except at very low temperatures, with which many compounds are formed:
  - Nitro compound, an organic compound containing one or more nitro functional groups, -NO_{2}
  - Nitro ligand in coordination chemistry
  - Nitroalkene, a functional group combining the functionality of an alkene and nitro group
  - Nitrocellulose, or cellulose nitrate, an extremely flammable chemical compound
  - Nitroglycerin, or glyceryl trinitrate, an explosive chemical compound
  - Nitromethane, a simple organic nitro compound with the formula CH_{3}NO_{2}
    - Nitro fuel, a fuel containing nitromethane and methanol
      - Nitro engine, an engine powered with nitro fuel used in some radio-controlled model cars, aircraft etc.

== People ==
- Danny Lee Clark (born 1964), known as "Nitro" on the original American Gladiators television show
- Harry Aikines-Aryeetey (born 1988), known as "Nitro" on the UK Gladiators television show
- John Morrison (wrestler) (born 1979), professional wrestler formerly known as Johnny Nitro
- Nitro (rapper) (born 1993), Italian rapper
- Nitro (wrestler) (born 1966), Mexican professional wrestler

== Places ==
- Giant, Richmond, California, formerly named Nitro
- Nitro, West Virginia, United States

== Arts and entertainment ==
- Nitro (Imagicaa), a roller coaster at the Imagicaa theme park in Khopoli, India
- Nitro (film), a Canadian action film released in 2007
- Nitro (Six Flags Great Adventure), a mega roller coaster at Six Flags Great Adventure in Jackson Township, New Jersey, United States

=== Fictional characters ===
- Nitro (character), a Marvel Comics supervillain
- Nitro Norimaki, a character from the Dr. Slump franchise
- Nitro, a character in the children's show The Shak played by Beau Walker

=== Music ===
- Nitro (band), a 1980s metal band
- "Nitro (Youth Energy)", a song by The Offspring from the album Smash
- Nitro Records, an independent punk music record label

=== Television ===
- "Nitro", an episode of Mission: Impossible
- Nitro!, a game show hosted by Greg Lee
- WCW Monday Nitro, a professional wrestling television program

=== Theatre ===
- Nitrobeat, a British theatre company, founded in 1979 as the Black Theatre Co-operative, renamed Nitro in 1999

=== Videogaming ===
- Need for Speed: Nitro, a 2009 racing game
- Nicktoons Nitro, a 2009 racing game for the Arcade
- Nintendo DS, originally referred to by the codename "Project Nitro"
- Nitro (video game), a 1990 computer game

== Media ==
- Nitro (German TV channel), a German commercial television channel
- Nitro (Spanish TV channel), a former Spanish commercial television channel owned by Atresmedia
- WMMS-HD2, an HD Radio digital subchannel (100.7-2 FM) licensed to Cleveland, Ohio, United States, formerly branded Nitro

== Computing and technology ==
- Nitro (wireless networking), an 802.11g performance enhancement technology
- Nitro cyberattacks
- Nitro, a marketing name given by Apple to JavaScriptCore, the JavaScript engine of WebKit
- Nitro PDF, a commercial software application
- Nitro, a paid membership on Discord
- Nitro, an open source framework for building web servers, created for the Nuxt framework.

== Medicine ==
- Glyceryl trinitrate (pharmacology), a medical compound used for the treatment of angina pectoris
- Medical use of nitroglycerin, prescribed for some heart conditions
- Nitrous oxide, "laughing gas", used in some dental procedures as an anaesthetic

== Vehicles and transportation ==
- Dodge Nitro, a compact SUV
- USS Nitro, a ship
- Nitro, a Spanish competition paraglider design by Windtech Parapentes
- Nitrous oxide engine, an automotive modification

== Other ==
- Nitro cold brew coffee
- Nitro Express, a series of cartridges used in large-bore hunting rifles
- Nitro, a flavor of Takis

== See also ==
- Nitre
- Nitra
