= Kyp =

Kyp or KYP may refer to:

- KYP, the abbreviation for the former name of the Greece National Intelligence Service in Greek
- Kalyanpur railway station, Uttar Pradesh, India, Indian Railways station code KYP
- Kyp Harness, a Canadian activist
- Kyp Malone, an American musician
- KYPS (Keep Your Password Secret), a web service
- The Kyaukpyu Airport, also known by its airport code of KYP
- Kyp Astar, a fictional character in the 2005 video game Star Wars: Battlefront II
- Kyp Durron, a fictional character in Star Wars Legends media
- kyp, the lead developer of the video game Saeko: Giantess Dating Sim
