= FreeOTP =

Free and open-source two-factor authentication app

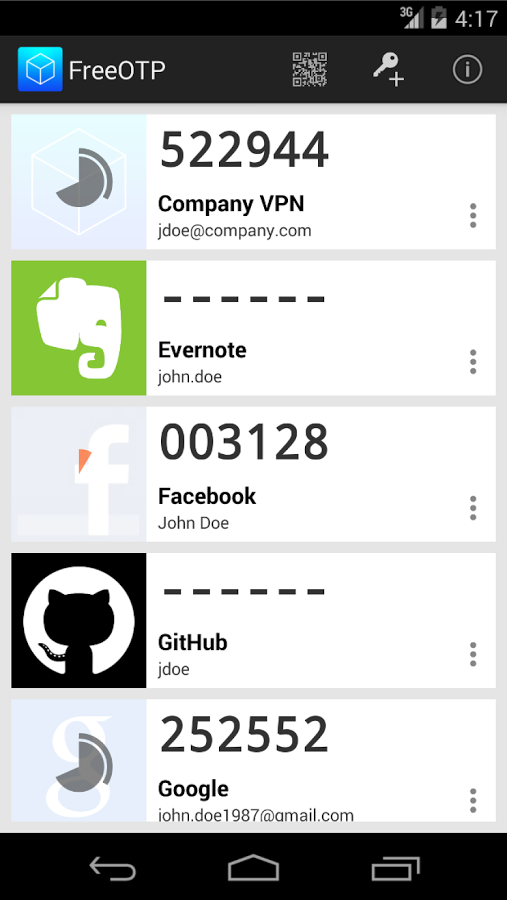
- Screenshot
- Developer: Red Hat
- Release: 24 October 2013; 13 years ago
Stable release
- Android: 2.0.6 / 17 February 2026; 9 months ago
- iOS: 2.3.6 / 18 November 2025; 11 months ago
- Written in: Java, Swift
- Operating system: Android, iOS
- Standards: HOTP, TOTP
- Type: One-time password software
- License: Apache License 2.0
- Website: freeotp.github.io
- Repository: github.com/freeotp

FreeOTP is a free and open-source authenticator by Red Hat Enterprise Linux. It implements multi-factor authentication using HOTP and TOTP. Tokens can be added by scanning a QR code or by manually entering the token configuration. It is licensed under the Apache 2.0 license, and supports Android and iOS. FreeOTP has very little support or online documentation. Creating an account is not required and for those concerned about privacy, the FreeOTP does not track users' data or establish outside server connections. Encrypted backups are optional. The app is very simple and lightweight.

== See also ==
- Comparison of OTP applications
- Google Authenticator
