= Kingsley Chibuzor Aguoru =

- Born: 1967 (age 58–59); United Kingdom
- Citizenship: British-Nigerian
- Occupations: Engineer, Technology entrepreneur

Kingsley Chibuzor Aguoru (born 1967) is a British-Nigerian engineer and a technology entrepreneur, living in the United Kingdom.

== Professional career ==
Kingsley is a doctor of information security and British chartered engineer.

As a postgraduate researcher at the University of Liverpool in 2005 invented the idea of one-time passwords (OTPs) for card-not-present payments called SMSVerify using both online through SMS and offline using cartesian geometry mathematical framework which relies on Algebraic structure. Aguoru has more than 20 years of experience in financial technologies and security.

He is the founder and Director of Paymenex Limited.

In 2024, Dr. Kingsley Chibuzor Aguoru petitioned the Central Bank of Nigeria (CBN) and the Economic and Financial Crimes Commission (EFCC) to stop the use of card PINs for online payments to prevent Nigerians from being defrauded of their money.

== Early life ==
Kingsley holds Doctor of Information Security degree from the University of East London, and Master of Science in Information Technology with specialization in Information Security from the University of Liverpool.
