= PoisonIvy =

Malware

PoisonIvy is a remote access trojan that enables key logging, screen capturing, video capturing, file transfers, system administration, password theft, and traffic relaying. It was created around 2005 by a Chinese hacker and has been used in several prominent hacks, including a breach of the RSA SecurID authentication tool and the Nitro attacks on chemical companies, both in 2011. Another name for the malware is "Backdoor.Darkmoon".
