= Access code =

Access code may refer to:

== Authentication ==
- Password, a secret word
- Personal identification number (PIN), a secret numeric code

== Telecommunications ==
- Trunk access code, used to dial a domestic call
- International access code, used to dial an international call
- Area code, a segment of a telephone number

== Other ==
- Access Code (film), a 1984 film with Macdonald Carey
