= OPIE Authentication System =

One-time password authentication system

OPIE is the initialism of "One time Passwords In Everything". Opie is a mature, Unix-like login and password package installed on the server and the client which makes untrusted networks safer against password-sniffing packet-analysis software like dSniff and safe against shoulder surfing. It works by circumventing the delayed attack method because the same password is never used twice after installing Opie. OPIE implements a one-time password (OTP) scheme based on S/KEY, which will require a secret passphrase to generate a password for the current session, or a list of passwords.

OPIE uses an MD4 or MD5 hash function to generate passwords.

OPIE can restrict its logins based on IP address. It uses its own passwd and login modules.

If the Enter key ↵ Enter is pressed at the password prompt, it will turn echo on, so what is being typed can be seen when entering an unfamiliar password from a printout.

OPIE can improve security when accessing online banking at conferences, hotels and airports. Some countries require banks to implement OTP.

OPIE shipped with DragonFly BSD, FreeBSD and OpenSUSE. It can be installed on a Unix-like server and clients for improved security.

The commands are

- opiepasswd
- opiekey

== See also ==
- OTPW
