= Google Authenticator =

Two-step verification app

- Screenshot Screenshot of the Google Authenticator software package running on the Android mobile operating system as of 2023
- Developer: Google
- Release: September 20, 2010; 16 years ago

Stable release(s) [±]
- Android: 7.2 / June 26, 2026; 4 months ago
- iOS: 5.2 / November 4, 2026; 14 days ago
- Written in: Java (Android); Objective-C (iOS)
- Operating system: Android 9+, (Note: Including Wear OS) iOS 17+ (Note: Including iPadOS) Discontinued: Android 6, 7, 8, iOS 15, 16 (2026); Android KitKat, 5, iOS 14 (2024); BlackBerry OS (2022); iOS 11, 12 (2021); iOS 7, 8, 9, 10 (2020); Android Gingerbread, Ice Cream Sandwich, Jelly Bean (2018); Android Froyo (2015); Android Eclair (2013)
- License: Proprietary freeware (some versions were under Apache License 2.0)
- Repository: github.com/google/google-authenticator

Google Authenticator is a software-based authenticator by Google. It implements multi-factor authentication services using the time-based one-time password (TOTP; specified in RFC 6238) and HMAC-based one-time password (HOTP; specified in RFC 4226), for authenticating users of software applications.

When logging into a site supporting Authenticator (including Google services) or using Authenticator-supporting third-party applications such as password managers or file hosting services, Authenticator generates a six-digit one-time password which users must enter in addition to their usual login details.

Google provides Android, BlackBerry, and iOS versions of Authenticator. Authenticator started backing-up to the cloud in 2023 for logged-in users making it easier to switch devices. It does not make it easy to switch between competitor products and collects more data than some of its competitors like Aegis or Stratum. The app is relatively easy-to-use and was the most prominent app for multi-factor authentication as of 2023.

An official open source fork of the Android app is available on GitHub. However, this fork was archived in April 6, 2021 and is now read only. Current software releases are proprietary software. Google does not end-to-end encrypt backups.

== Typical use case ==
Previous logo

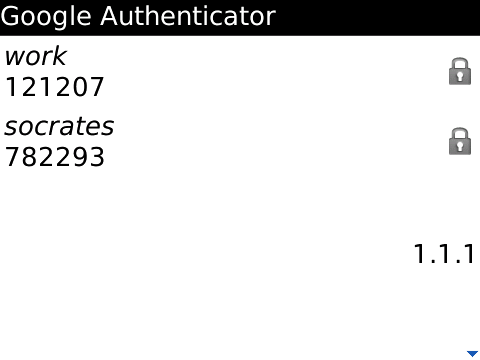
Screenshot of the Google Authenticator in April 2012, this was the open-source version

The app is first installed on a smartphone to use Authenticator. It must be set up for each site with which it is to be used: the site provides a shared secret key to the user over a secure channel, to be stored in the Authenticator app. This secret key will be used for all future logins to the site.

To log into a site or service that uses two-factor authentication and supports Authenticator, the user provides a username and password to the site. The site then computes (but does not display) the required six-digit one-time password and asks the user to enter it. The user runs the Authenticator app, which independently computes and displays the same password, which the user types in, authenticating their identity.

With this kind of two-factor authentication, knowledge of username and password is insufficient to get into a user's account - the attacker would need knowledge of the shared secret key or physical access to the device running the Authenticator app. A man-in-the-middle attack is another risk for users if their device used for the login process is compromised by malware, the credentials and one-time password can be intercepted by the malware, which then can initiate its login session to the site, or monitor and modify the communication between the user and the site.

== Technical description ==
During setup, the service provider generates an 80-bit secret key for each user (whereas RFC 4226 §4 requires 128 bits and recommends 160 bits). This is transferred to the Authenticator app as a 16, 24, or 32-character base32 string, or as a QR code.

Subsequently, when the user opens the Authenticator app, it calculates an HMAC-SHA1 hash value using this secret key. The message can be:

- The number of 30-second periods since the Unix epoch (TOTP) as 64-bit big endian integer; or
- A counter that is incremented with each new code (HOTP).

A portion of the HMAC is extracted and displayed to the user as a six- to eight-digit code; The last nibble (4 bits) of the result is used as a pointer, to a 32-bit integer, in the result byte array, and masks out the 31st bit.

== License ==
The Google Authenticator app for Android was open source upon launch in 2010 before becoming proprietary in 2013. Google made earlier source code for their Authenticator app available on its GitHub repository where the latest open-source release was in 2020.

== See also ==
- Multi-factor authentication
- HMAC-based one-time password
- FreeOTP
- LinOTP
- Comparison of OTP applications
