= Passkey (disambiguation) =

A passkey is a WebAuthn credential used for signing into a website, often instead of a password.

Passkey may also refer to:

- a skeleton key, also known historically as a passkey
- a key cut to be a master key for a set of locks, see master keying
- the 6-digit numeric code used when pairing a Bluetooth device
