= Passkey =

Passwordless authentication credential key

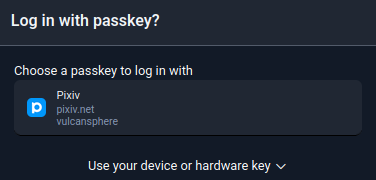
Login passkey selection page to application (Pixiv) through password manager (Bitwarden)

A passkey, also known as security key, is a pair of cryptographic keys that is generated by a user's authenticator linked to an account to authenticate a user's identity against a remote application or system by using public-key cryptography, thus avoiding the need to reveal the secret key held by the user through public channels. The current popular implementation of passkeys for general public usage in web technologies is proposed by FIDO Alliance and standardised by the World Wide Web Consortium under the WebAuthn standard, and “passkey” is the de-facto non-technical term used to refer to WebAuthn credentials.

Passkeys have been touted as a more convenient and secure replacement for passwords though has not replaced the need for a password and have not always been intuitive for use across different browsers or devices. In October 2026 the FIDO Alliance estimated that 7 billion passkeys were in use worldwide though many websites still do not offer the option of using a passkey.

== Technical ==
Passkey is based on public-key cryptography that is designed for passwordless authentication, where user credential is a private key stored on the user's authenticator and the application system stores the public key that can be used to create a cryptographic challenge that can only be solved by the user credential, thereby authenticating the user's identity. The process transfers only publicly known information to the user, who then returns the solved challenge without transferring the private key openly through public channels (which may be eavesdropped), thus making it more secure than traditional authentication method such as passwords that could be tapped and used by remote attackers. The term passkey does not refer to any specific technology, but due to the origin and widespread adoption within FIDO2 ecosystem, the term is now commonly associated with FIDO2 credential.

The user credential (private key) is stored inside an authenticator, which may be a physical device (common referred as a security key), secure cryptoprocessor such as Trusted Platform Module, password managers or keyrings. Software-based authenticator clients may offer additional features such as biometric authentication like Touch ID or Windows Hello for better security, or cloud sync for ease of usage across devices.

== Implementations ==
=== FIDO2 (WebAuthn + CTAP2) ===
FIDO2 passkeys are commonly used by web technologies such as mobile apps and websites for user authentication. This is done by allowing applications to request a challenge from the device client (e.g. web browser or operating system) through WebAuthn, and then the device client relaying to the hardware carrying out the cryptographic operation through CTAP2.

The use of the term passkey to refer to the private key/user credential starts in June 2022, where Apple announces that they will start to support passkeys as an authentication method in iOS and macOS devices, debuting the term "passkey" to the general public. Google announced in October 2022 that Android and Google Chrome would support passkeys, followed by Microsoft on Windows 11 in September 2023. From 1 May 2025, newly created Microsoft accounts were made "passwordless by default".

Some implementations of WebAuthn passkeys allow storage of user identifiers inside the passkey itself, allowing users to directly authenticate as the defined identity instead of providing an identifier (such as email or username) separately. Other implementations of WebAuthn passkeys acts as part of multi-factor authentication, requiring additional authentication methods such as password or email verification to be used together.

=== Resident Key ===
A resident key is a private credential that is specifically stored inside an external physical device that may be disconnected from the machine that validates the credential. This is used by OpenSSH protocol. In WebAuthn, it is called a discoverable credential.

=== FIDO UAF ===
FIDO Universal Authentication Framework (UAF), along with FIDO U2F, are precursors of FIDO2 and influenced its design. FIDO UAF stores the private key directly on a physical device (commonly a smartphone) instead of relying on an external authenticator protocol such as CTAP. Because the private key is bound to that device, it cannot be backed up or transferred to another device.

== Benefits ==
Passkeys can be more convenient than traditional authentication methods and offer greater resistance to phishing attacks and data breaches. They are protected by the devices on which they are stored and often leverage biometric authentication as an additional layer of security, eliminating the need for users to remember passwords. Compared with related terms such as FIDO and WebAuthn, the term “passkey” is generally preferred in marketing because it is less likely to cause confusion and avoid pushing out jargon.

== Challenges ==
However, as of 2026, most platforms still require other methods of authentication like passwords alongside passkeys, which may reduce the security benefits of using passkeys. Passkeys can be more difficult to use across different browsers, operating systems or devices though password managers can make signing-in across devices easier. Passkeys are still not an option on many websites as of 2026.

== See also ==
- ssh-keygen
