= Trusona =

American identity software company

- Type: Private
- Industry: Computer security
- Founded: 2015; 11 years ago in Scottsdale, Arizona, U.S.
- Founder: Ori Eisen
- Headquarters: Scottsdale, Arizona, U.S.
- Key people: Ori Eisen (CEO)
- Products: Identity verification, passwordless authentication

Trusona is an American identity software company based in Scottsdale, Arizona. The company was founded in 2015 by Ori Eisen, who had previously founded the device-identification firm The 41st Parameter. Trusona launched an identity-verification product in 2016, later became known for passwordless authentication, and raised about US$38 million in venture funding through 2020.

== History ==
=== Founding ===
Trusona was founded in 2015 by Ori Eisen. Eisen had earlier worked as worldwide fraud director at American Express and founded The 41st Parameter, a device-identification company that Experian acquired in 2013 for US$324 million. The company came out of stealth on February 22, 2016, with an identity-verification platform developed with input from the fraud consultant Frank Abagnale, who had advised Eisen at his earlier company. The first product combined in-person identity proofing, a hardware token, and anti-replay technology intended to prevent the reuse of captured authentication data.

=== Funding ===
Trusona raised an US$8 million Series A round led by Kleiner Perkins in February 2016. In June 2017 it raised US$10 million in a round led by Microsoft Ventures, with Kleiner Perkins also participating. In January 2020 the company raised a US$20 million Series C round led by Georgian Partners, with participation from Kleiner Perkins, M12, OurCrowd, and Seven Peaks Ventures, and Akamai Technologies as a strategic investor. The round brought Trusona's total funding to about US$38 million.

=== Passwordless authentication ===
In May 2017 Trusona introduced passwordless sign-in for Salesforce. It later added passwordless authentication for Microsoft services and Windows 10, which the company positioned alongside revised NIST digital-identity guidance. In February 2022 Trusona joined the board of directors of the FIDO Alliance. In May 2022 it released Trusona Authentication Cloud, an app-less passwordless sign-in service based on the FIDO and WebAuthn standards.

=== Later direction ===
In 2024 Trusona announced ATO Protect, a service aimed at preventing account-takeover fraud during account-recovery and IT help-desk interactions. In 2026 the company released an integration of ATO Protect with ServiceNow.

== Technology ==
Trusona's early products used anti-replay techniques to stop captured authentication data from being reused, and the company was granted a related U.S. patent in 2020. Its later authentication products implemented the FIDO2 and WebAuthn standards for passwordless sign-in.
