= Christopher Mims =

American journalist

- Born: United States
- Education: Emory University
- Occupation: Technology journalist
- Employer: The Wall Street Journal

Christopher Mims is an American author and technology columnist at The Wall Street Journal, which he joined in 2014.

== Early life ==
Mims received a bachelor's degree in neuroscience and behavioral biology from Emory University in 2001.

== Career ==
Mims taught English in Japan for six months and worked in a neuroscience lab.

He was a science and technology correspondent and editor for Quartz, and also worked as an editor at Scientific American, Technology Review, Smithsonian and Grist. Mims has also had bylines in The BBC, Wired, and Nature. Mims was also a producer at Small Mammal, where he helped director John Pavlus produce science videos for Slate, Popular Science, and Nature.

Mims wrote in a 2014 article for The Wall Street Journal stating that the password "is finally dying." He predicted that passwords would be replaced by device-based authentication. To prove his point, he purposefully revealed his Twitter password. He later wrote that his Twitter account stayed secure, but a security researcher was able to exploit a vulnerability in Twitter to steal his cell phone number; ultimately he had to get a new cellphone number.

In 2017, Mims won a Society for Advancing Business Editing and Writing (SABEW) a Best in Business award for his column in The Wall Street Journal.

In September 2021, his book Arriving Today: From Factory to Front Door -- Why Everything Has Changed About How and What We Buy was published by HarperCollins. The book focused on e-commerce and its effects on the modern world, from supply chains, to sustainability, to the workers who make the goods we buy, and move those products around the world. The book follows a hypothetical USB drive from its manufacture in Vietnam, to delivery at a hypothetical home in Connecticut. Because the book was published in 2021, it also examines the effects of the COVID-19 pandemic on e-commerce supply chains. The book won a 2021 Business Book Award from Porchlight Books, in the Current Events category.
