= Entersekt =

South African fintech

- Type: Private
- Industry: Finance; Software development
- Founded: 2010; 16 years ago
- Founder: Schalk Nolte; Dewald Nolte
- Headquarters: Stellenbosch, Western Cape, South Africa; Atlanta, USA
- Key people: Clare Conway (CEO)
- Products: Financial transaction security software
- Website: entersekt.com

Entersekt is a South African fintech and provider of mobile-based authentication and app security software for the protection of online and mobile banking transactions.

== History ==
Entersekt was founded in 2010 by brothers Schalk and Dewald Nolte, and three fellow University of Stellenbosch students.

In February 2016, the Colorado-based FirstBank opted for Entersekt’s Transakt technology to enhance the security of its mobile banking application.

In July 2016, Entersekt partnered with Crealogix, a Swiss fintech company and Netcetera, a software company and digital payment expert.

In June 2017, Entersekt received an undisclosed amount as an investment from AlphaCode and BoE Private Equity Investments.

In 2017 April, the company won the Best Mobile Security Technology Award at the 2017 Banker Africa Southern Africa Banking Awards.
