= Web Authentication Working Group =

Organization founded by W3C

- Abbreviation: WebAuthn WG
- Formation: February 17, 2016; 9 years ago
- Legal status: Working group
- Purpose: Public-key cryptography APIs for the web
- Leader: John Fontana; Anthony Nadalin
- Parent organization: W3C
- Website: Official website

The Web Authentication Working Group, created by the World Wide Web Consortium (W3C) on February 17, 2016, has for mission, in the Security Activity, to define a client-side API providing strong authentication functionality to Web Applications.

On 20 March 2018, the WebAuthn standard was published as a W3C Candidate Recommendation.
