= Ssh-keygen =

Component of Secure Shell

ssh-keygen
- Developer: The OpenBSD Project
- Written in: C
- Operating system: Unix, Unix-like, Microsoft Windows
- Type: Command
- License: BSD, ISC, public domain
- Website: www.openssh.com
- Repository: github.com/openssh/openssh-portable/

ssh-keygen is a standard component of the Secure Shell (SSH) protocol suite found on Unix, Unix-like and Microsoft Windows computer systems used to establish secure shell sessions between remote computers over insecure networks, through the use of various cryptographic techniques. The ssh-keygen utility is used to generate, manage, and convert authentication keys.

== Overview ==
ssh-keygen is able to generate a key using one of three different digital signature algorithms. With the help of the ssh-keygen tool, a user can create passphrase keys for any of these key types. To provide for unattended operation, the passphrase can be left empty, albeit at increased risk. These keys differ from keys used by the related tool GNU Privacy Guard.

OpenSSH-based client and server programs have been included in Windows 10 since version 1803. The SSH client and key agent are enabled and available by default and the SSH server is an optional Feature-on-Demand.

== Key formats supported ==
Example: ssh-keygen -t rsa

Protocol	-t option	Creation Date	Status in 2025
RSA	rsa	1977	Universally supported among SSH clients
DSA	dsa	1991	Deprecated in 2013
ECDSA	ecdsa	1999	Vulnerable
EDDSA	ed25519	2005	Performs faster than RSA with significantly smaller keys

Originally, with SSH protocol version 1 (now deprecated) only the RSA algorithm was supported. As of 2016, RSA is still considered strong, but the recommended key length has increased over time.

The SSH protocol version 2 additionally introduced support for the DSA algorithm. DSA is now considered weak and was disabled in OpenSSH 7.0.

Subsequently, OpenSSH added support for a third digital signature algorithm, ECDSA (this key format no longer uses the previous PEM file format for private keys, nor does it depend upon the OpenSSL library to provide the cryptographic implementation).

A fourth format is supported using Ed25519, originally developed by independent cryptography researcher Daniel J. Bernstein.

== Command syntax ==
The syntax of the ssh-keygen command is as follows:

ssh-keygen [options]

Some important options of the ssh-keygen command are as follows:

ssh-keygen command options	description
-b bits	Specifies the number of bits in the key to create. The default length is 3072 bits (RSA) or 256 bits (ECDSA).
-C comment	Provides custom key comment (which will be appended at the end of the public key).
-K	Imports a private resident key from a FIDO2 device.
-p	Requests changing the passphrase of a private key file instead of creating a new private key.
-t	Specifies the type of key to create (e.g., rsa).
-o	Use the new OpenSSH format.
-q	quiets ssh-keygen. It is used by the /etc/rc file while creating a new key.
-N	Provides a new Passphrase.
-B	Dumps the key's fingerprint in Bubble Babble format.
-l	Dumps the key's fingerprint in SHA-2 (or MD5) format.

== Files used by the ssh-keygen utility ==
The ssh-keygen utility generates files for storing public and private keys. Note : they are stored in $HOME/.ssh/ as follows:

=== SSH protocol version 2 ===
Quick Recap
Algorithm	Private	Public
RSA	id_rsa	id_rsa.pub
DSA	id_dsa	id_dsa.pub
ECDSA	id_ecdsa	id_ecdsa.pub
ed25519	id_ed25519	id_ed25519.pub

- The $HOME/.ssh/id_dsa file contains the protocol version 2 DSA authentication identity of the user.
- The $HOME/.ssh/id_dsa.pub file contains the DSA public key for authentication when you are using the SSH protocol version 2.
  - A user should copy its contents in the $HOME/.ssh/authorized_keys file of the remote system where a user wants to log in using DSA authentication.
- The $HOME/.ssh/id_rsa file contains the protocol version 2 RSA authentication identity of the user.
  - This file should not be readable by anyone but the user.
- The $HOME/.ssh/id_rsa.pub file contains the protocol version 2 RSA public key for authentication.
  - The contents of this file should be added to $HOME/.ssh/authorized_keys on all computers where a user wishes to log in using public key authentication.

=== SSH protocol version 1 ===
- The $HOME/.ssh/identity file contains the RSA private key when using the SSH protocol version 1.
- The $HOME/.ssh/identity.pub file contains the RSA public key for authentication when you are using the SSH protocol version 1.
  - A user should copy its contents in the $HOME/.ssh/authorized_keys file of the remote system where a user wants to log in using RSA authentication.
