= Proton (disambiguation) =

A proton is a subatomic particle.

Proton may also refer to:

== In chemistry ==
- Proton, the hydron ion (notated H^{+})
- Proton, hydronium (also called hydroxonium) ion (notated H_{3}O^{+})
- Proton-pump inhibitor, a group of drugs
- Proton conductor, an electrolyte
- Proton-coupled electron transfer, a chemical reaction mechanism
- Proton spectrum, the nuclear magnetic resonance spectrum of the ^{1}H nucleus

== In sports and entertainment ==
- Proton Competition, a German auto racing team
- Proton F.C., football club in the Malaysian Premier League sponsored by the carmaker that existed between 1986 and 2009
- Proton Radio, an internet electronic music station

== In technology ==
- Ozone Proton, a French paraglider design
- Protei-5 Russian diver propulsion vehicle called a "Proton", Russian diver propulsion vehicle
- Proton (rocket family), Russian uncrewed space vehicle design
  - Proton-K, a rocket
  - Proton-M, a rocket
- Proton satellite, Soviet satellite
- Proton-transfer-reaction mass spectrometry, a technique to monitor volatile organic compounds online
- Proton (software), a Wine-based compatibility tool for Linux
- Products of the company Proton AG
  - Proton Mail, an encrypted email service
  - Proton VPN, an encrypted VPN service
  - Proton Pass, an encrypted password manager
  - Proton Drive, an encrypted cloud storage service
  - Proton Calendar, an encrypted digital calendar
  - Proton Wallet, an encrypted digital wallet
  - Proton Docs, an encrypted document writing tool
- Original name of the BBC Micro microcomputer
- Proton, a model of diving equipment made by Siebe Gorman

== In business ==
- Proton AG, a Swiss company offering privacy-focused online services
- Proton (debit card), a discontinued electronic debit card from Belgium
- Proton Bank, an investment bank in Greece
- Proton Electronic, a Taiwanese manufacturer of consumer audio and video equipment founded in 1964
- Proton Holdings, a Malaysian car producer

== Other uses ==
- USS Proton (AG-147), a US Navy tank landing ship
- Professor Proton, a fictional scientist in The Big Bang Theory television series universe
- Proton (band), an Australian rock band

== See also ==
- Proto (disambiguation)
