= Vivaldi Technologies =

Norwegian software company

Vivaldi Technologies AS
- Type: Private
- Industry: Software
- Founded: 2013; 13 years ago
- Founders: Jon Stephenson von Tetzchner; Tatsuki Tomita; Anne Christiansen
- Headquarters: Mølleparken 6, Oslo, Norway
- Key people: Jon Stephenson von Tetzchner (CEO and Co-Founder) and Tatsuki Tomita (COO and Co-Founder)
- Products: Vivaldi.net; Vivaldi Browser; Vivaldi Mail
- Number of employees: 60 (2025)
- Website: vivaldi.com

Vivaldi Technologies AS is a Norwegian software development company, best known for its creation of the Vivaldi Browser. Headquartered in Oslo, Norway, the company was founded in 2013 by Jon von Tetzchner and Tatsuki Tomita. Tetzchner was one of the founders and formerly the CEO of Opera Software, a software company that developed the web browser Opera. About 20 former Opera employees joined Tetzchner at Vivaldi Technologies. In January 2017, the company had 35 employees. As of April 2025, the company has listed 60 employees.

Vivaldi is employee-owned, and derives revenue from product placement but not data. Its browsers are also AI-algorithm free.

== History ==
=== Founding and early development ===
Vivaldi Technologies was registered in August 2013. Von Tetzchner, previously a co-founder and chief executive of Opera Software, said he had not intended to build another browser after leaving that company, but changed his mind in the second half of 2013 after Opera discarded first its own browser engine and then its user interface, a shift he said had left part of the user base dissatisfied. The project was kept unannounced for about 18 months; von Tetzchner said disclosing it earlier would have created expectations and pressure to ship before the team was ready.

At the time of the first technical preview in January 2015 the company had 25 employees, slightly more than half of them former Opera Software staff, and von Tetzchner had contributed 33 million NOK in the form of equity and loans. He said development was deliberately kept in-house rather than outsourced, on the grounds that a company should not contract out its core activity, and that the company operated with a flat structure.

Reuters described the company as named after the composer Antonio Vivaldi. Von Tetzchner himself has attributed the choice to the name being widely recognised and the domain being unregistered, adding that his grandmother was a composer and painter and his great-grandfather a well-known Icelandic composer.

=== Launch and growth ===
By November 2015, as the browser entered beta testing, it had been downloaded two million times. Von Tetzchner said at that point that the company would neither seek a stock market listing nor admit outside investors, that employees held shares, and that he had invested several tens of millions of kroner of his own money. Rolf Assev, a partner in the incubator StartupLab, sat on the board.

Version 1.0 followed 15 months of development that von Tetzchner said had cost him around 50 million NOK, or about 6.07 million USD, of his own funds. He held 90 per cent of the shares at that point, with employees holding smaller stakes, and said he had turned down approaches from several venture capital firms, citing the importance of retaining control of the company. A month after the stable release he said the browser was approaching roughly one million active users, while cautioning that the growth might be attributable to launch momentum.

Estimates of the user base needed for profitability varied. In 2016 von Tetzchner put the figure at five million monthly users; in 2017 and again in 2019 he gave a range of three to five million, with the company reporting close to one million users in September 2017 and 1.2 million desktop users in September 2019.

The Android application entered public beta in September 2019 after testing with around 100 alpha users, requiring Android 5.0 or later. Von Tetzchner said the company had initially worked on desktop and mobile in parallel before deciding to release the desktop version first, and that Apple platform rules prevented the reuse of the existing codebase on iOS. The iOS version, built separately on WebKit, was released in September 2023, at which point von Tetzchner put the user base at 2.5 to 3 million across all platforms. In March 2026 the company claimed four million users.

On 27 March 2025, Vivaldi and the Swiss company Proton AG announced the integration of Proton VPN into the desktop version of the browser, accessible through a Vivaldi account without a separate download or extension, with a free tier and an optional paid upgrade. Both companies presented the arrangement as a European alternative to services offered by large United States technology firms.

== Corporate structure and finances ==
Vivaldi Technologies AS is registered in Norway under organisation number 912 309 975. Development of the browser is financed by Vivaldi Invest, von Tetzchner's investment company, and the group also includes subsidiaries in Iceland and the United States, with costs booked in Norway. According to Norwegian company registry data, the company has 3,896,000 shares and a share capital of approximately 3.98 million NOK, divided among 63 shareholders, of which Vivaldi Invest AS holds about 81.3 per cent; co-founders Tatsuki Tomita and Anne Christiansen hold minority stakes. In 2023 von Tetzchner described the company as employee-owned while holding most of the shares himself, and said it would remain self-funded and would not go public, citing his disagreement with investors over the sale of Opera Software.

For the 2016 financial year, the company reported revenue of 4.4 million NOK and a pre-tax loss of 63.5 million NOK, against a pre-tax loss of 9.7 million NOK the previous year. Von Tetzchner attributed the deficit to development costs and said he was not concerned, describing an initial loss-making period as normal. Vivaldi Invest, by contrast, reported a pre-tax result of 34.7 million NOK for 2016 and equity of more than 500 million NOK. Registry data record a pre-tax loss of approximately 45.7 million NOK for 2025.

== Business model ==
The company has said its revenue comes from agreements to pre-install search engines, with Bing set as the default in the United Kingdom and users able to change it, and in part from pre-installed bookmarks. Von Tetzchner has stated that the business model is neither advertising-based nor dependent on tracking, while arguing that advertising-funded web content is acceptable and that tracking should be prohibited by law. Search partners announced around the 2016 launch included Bing, Yahoo and Yandex, with talks under way with Alphabet. In 2023 von Tetzchner said the company earned money from search engine deals and that Google was not among its partners.

== Workspaces ==
The company is headquartered in Oslo, Norway; it is named after the Italian classical music composer Antonio Vivaldi; it has offices at the Innovation House in Seltjarnarnes, Iceland, and a workspace in the Innovation House in Gloucester, Massachusetts, US. It also has developers in Helsinki, Finland; Prague, Czech Republic; Lille, France; and other locations.

== Competition and regulatory advocacy ==
In 2017 von Tetzchner publicly accused Google of obstructing Vivaldi, saying the company's access to the AdWords advertising network had been suspended and later restored without substantive explanation, conduct he characterised as sabotage.

Following the introduction of browser choice screens required by the Digital Markets Act, Vivaldi reported an increase in installations on iOS in the European Union in 2024. Von Tetzchner nonetheless criticised the implementation, noting that the screen appeared only after a user opened Safari, that it provided no additional information about the listed browsers, and that a browser already selected by the user might be omitted from the list. In October 2024 Vivaldi was among the signatories, alongside Open Web Advocacy, of a letter urging the European Commission to designate Microsoft Edge under the Digital Markets Act, arguing that the absence of a choice screen on Windows made alternative browsers less accessible.

== Products ==
=== Vivaldi.net ===
Vivaldi.net is a community-based platform that was originally launched in January 2014, which was created as a replacement to My Opera, due to the latter's planned closure in May 2014. The platform though has since been expanded to offer additional services that were not offered by My Opera — some designed particularly to work in tandem with the Vivaldi browser:

- Vivaldi Blogs: a blogging platform where users can create their own blog and publish articles for free.
- Vivaldi Webmail: an online email service that provides a free email account with 10 GB of storage.
- Vivaldi Forum: a forum to discuss Vivaldi's development, request features, and leave feedback for the browser.
- Vivaldi Sync: a means to synchronise bookmarks, settings, and history for the Vivaldi browser.
- Vivaldi Themes: a platform designed to share and find user created themes for the Vivaldi browser.
- Vivaldi Social: a Mastodon instance to connect to the Fediverse.

=== Vivaldi Browser ===
Vivaldi Technologies' main product is the Vivaldi Browser. The browser was created in part to cater to power users after Opera Software opted to abandon its own browser engine Presto in favor of WebKit (and later Blink), thereby dropping support of many of its features.

In January 2015, the first technical preview of the browser was released. In November 2015, the first beta version of the browser was released.

In April 2016, Vivaldi Technologies released Vivaldi 1.0, the first stable version of the browser.

In September 2019, Vivaldi Technologies released the first beta version of Vivaldi for Android.

In April 2020, Vivaldi Technologies released Vivaldi 3.0, the first stable version of Vivaldi for Android.

In December 2021 Vivaldi released a version of its browser for Android Automotive, initially in the Polestar 2, described as the first web browser on that platform; a session can only be started while the vehicle is parked. In May 2022 the browser was extended to Renault vehicles using the OpenR Link system, including the Megane E-Tech Electric and Austral; browsing data can be synchronised through a Vivaldi account but is neither stored in the car nor accessible to Renault.

=== Vivaldi Mail ===
In addition to the browser, Vivaldi Technologies also develops an email client, calendar, and a feed reader that are directly integrated as a component of the browser. Prior to the release of the browser, the company made the promise to integrate an email client, as a means to build "Opera as it should have been", which also integrated an email client into the Opera browser before becoming a separate product.

In November 2020, the first technical preview of the email client, calendar, and feed reader were released. In June 2021, beta versions of these components were released.

In June 2022, Vivaldi Technologies released Vivaldi Mail 1.0, the first stable version of the email client, calendar, and feed reader components.
