= Lumo (AI assistant) =

AI assistant

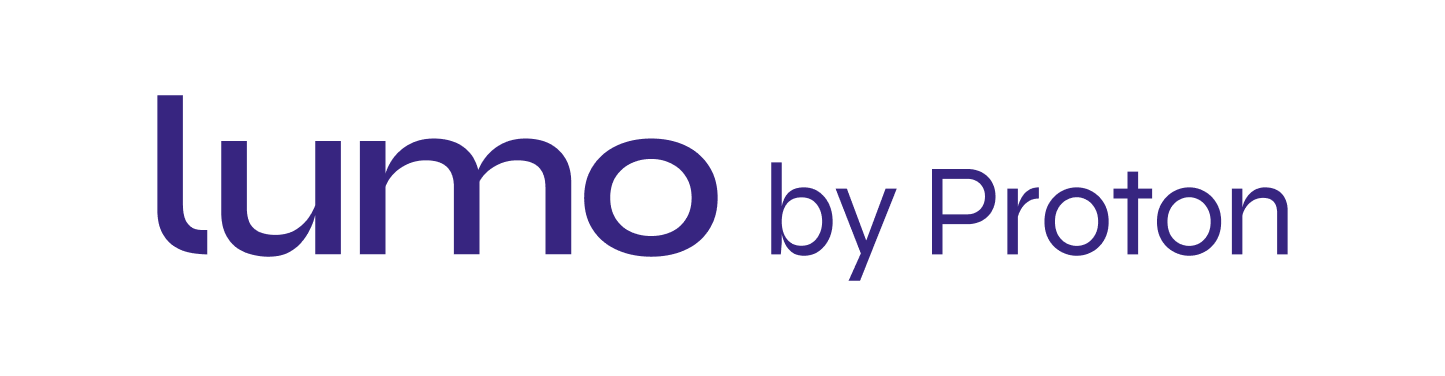
- Developer: Proton AG
- Release: July 23, 2025
- Stable release: 2.0 / June 30, 2026
- Written in: TypeScript
- Operating system: Web, iOS, Android
- Type: Artificial intelligence assistant
- License: Web and mobile clients: GPLv3; Server: Proprietary
- Website: lumo.proton.me
- Repository: github.com/ProtonLumo

Lumo is an online chatbot and personal assistant developed by Proton AG. The service saves chat histories in encrypted storage, and states that it does not employ user data for model training.

== History ==
Lumo was created by Proton, the Swiss company behind services such as Proton Mail, Proton VPN, Proton Pass, and Proton Drive. Development was led by Proton’s machine learning team. The product was officially launched on 23 July 2025. On 21 August 2025, Proton released version 1.1, which included performance improvements and upgraded models to enable more complex requests. On 16 October, Proton released version 1.2. On 30 October, Proton released their Lumo for Business plan, which is integrated with the Proton Business Suite. On 30 June 2026, Proton released version 2.0 which included image generation and recognition and other improvements.

== Features ==
Lumo allows users to summarize documents, generate code, and compose text. It incorporates privacy measures consistent with Proton's other services. At launch, Proton stated that Lumo conversations are not logged and that chat logs are stored with end-to-end encryption. According to Tom's Hardware, "This mechanism prevents third parties, including Proton itself, from accessing content generated or processed by the virtual assistant." The system does not use conversations to train the large language models. Lumo's mobile and web apps are open-source.

The assistant can be used without an account. Creating a Proton account enables synchronisation access to encrypted chat histories across multi-devices.

It is available as a web application and through iOS and Android mobile apps.

== Reception ==
PCMag described Lumo as a "ChatGPT alternative" that is focused on privacy. TechRadar described the service as a safer choice for handling confidential information.

The European Open Source AI Index was critical of Proton describing Lumo as "open source", calling Lumo "the least open 'open' AI assistant" and stating that Proton had "open-sourced neither the Lumo system prompt nor the mysterious routing methods that decide which model will handle [the user's] query". The index wrote that "the only open source code we have found is for the Lumo mobile and web apps. Proton calling the Lumo AI assistant open source based on that is a bit like Microsoft calling Windows open source just because there's a github repository for Windows Terminal".
