= Véliz =

Véliz (or Veliz) is a Spanish surname and a Czech toponym, and may refer to:

== People ==
- Alejo Véliz (footballer), Argentine professional footballer
- Alejo Véliz (politician), Bolivian politician
- Carissa Véliz, Mexican, Spanish, and British philosopher
- Carlos Véliz (athlete), Cuban olympic athlete
- Carlos Pezoa Véliz, Chilean poet and journalist
- Claudio Véliz, Chilean historian, sociologist and academic
- Edwin Westphal Véliz, Guatemalan footballer
- Leonardo Véliz, Chilean footballer and politician
- Marta Pizarro Véliz, Chilean educator, UNESCO education expert
- Mireya Véliz, Chilean actress
- María Milagros Véliz, Miss World Venezuela 2008
- Nehemiah Fernandez-Veliz, French footballer

== Places ==
- Velizh or Veliz (Russian: Велиж), a city in Russia
- Vélizy-Villacoublay, a commune in Paris, France; its residents are referred to as Véliziens
- Vélizy 2, a shopping centre in Paris, France
