= Lumo =

Lumo may refer to:

- Lumo (film), a 2007 documentary film
- Lumo (train operating company), a UK open access train operator
- Lumo (video game), a 2016 action-adventure game
- Lumo Energy, an Australian energy brand
- LUMO, in chemistry, lowest unoccupied molecular orbital
- Lumo, mascot for the Eurovision Song Contest 2025
- Lumo, a chatbot developed by Proton
