= Seltjarnarnes =

- Municipality
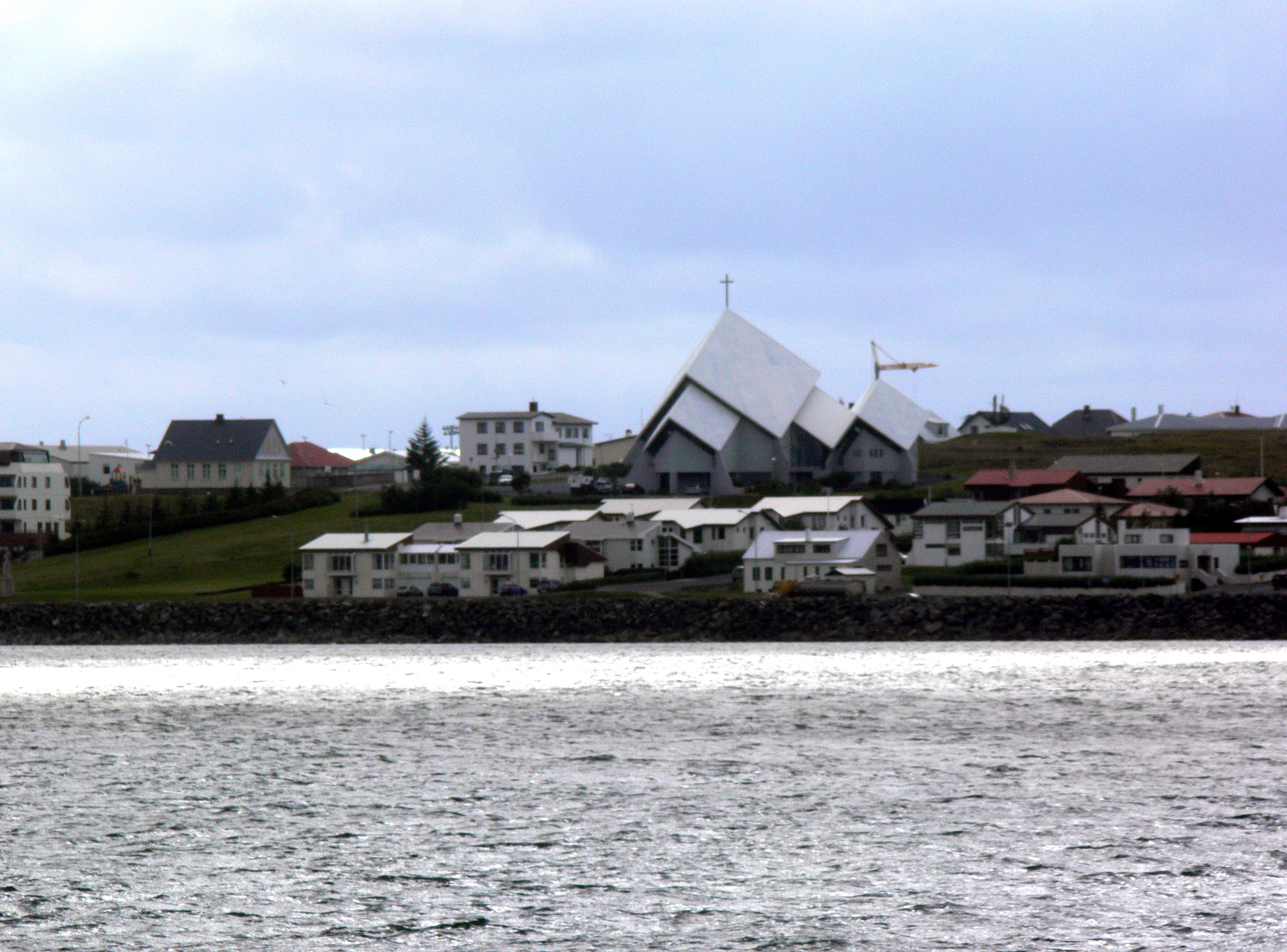
- Seltjarnarnes

- Coat of arms

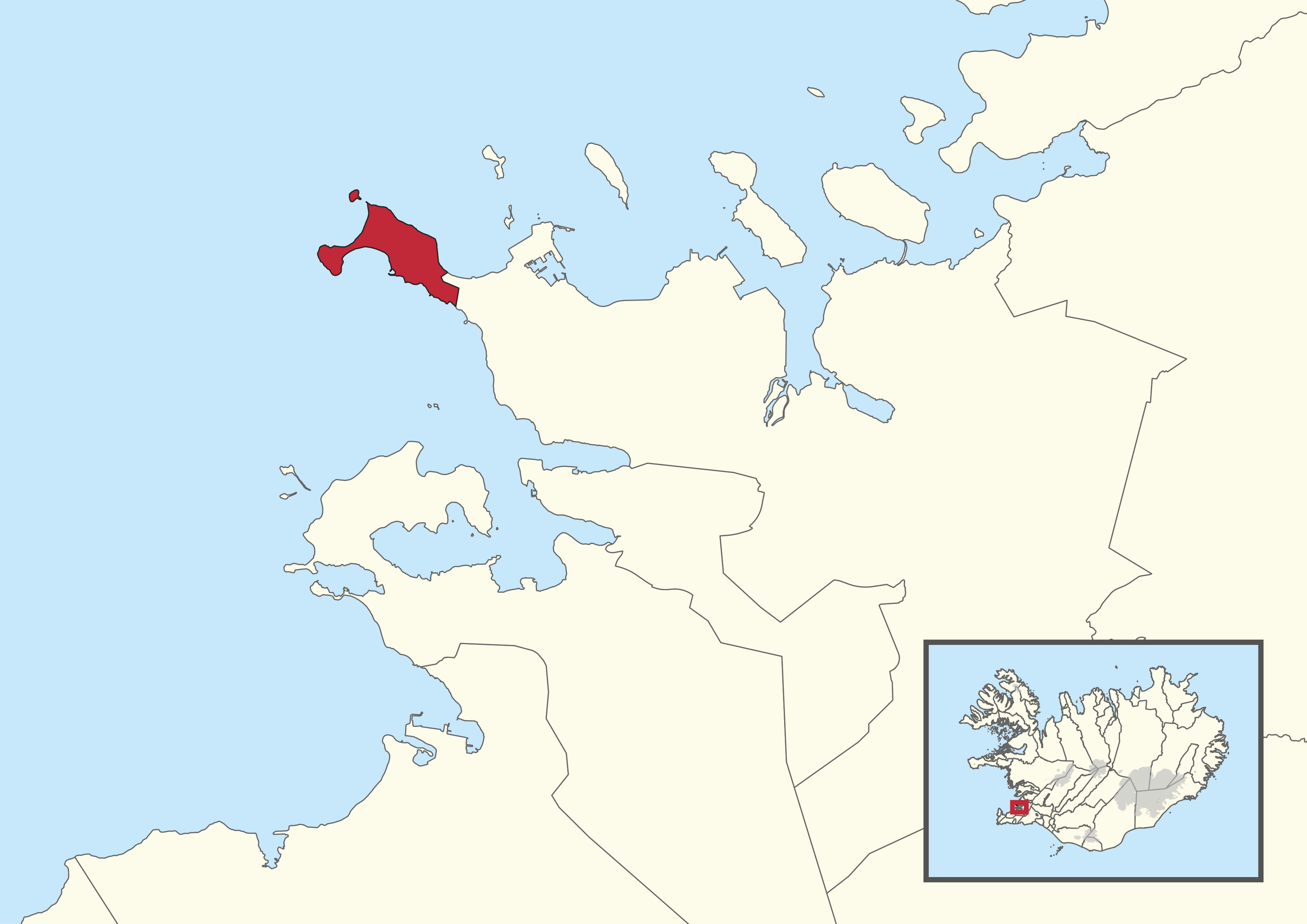
- Location of the municipality

- Location within Iceland
- Coordinates: 64°9′15″N 22°0′0″W
- Country: Iceland
- Region: Capital Region
- Constituency: Southwest Constituency
- Market right: 20 April 1974

Government
  - Mayor: Þór Sigurgeirsson (IP)

Area
  - Total: 2 km^{2} (0.77 sq mi)

Population (2025)
  - Total: 4,585
  - Density: 2,300/km^{2} (5,900/sq mi)
- Postal code(s): 170–172
- Municipal number: 1100
- Website: seltjarnarnes.is (in Icelandic)

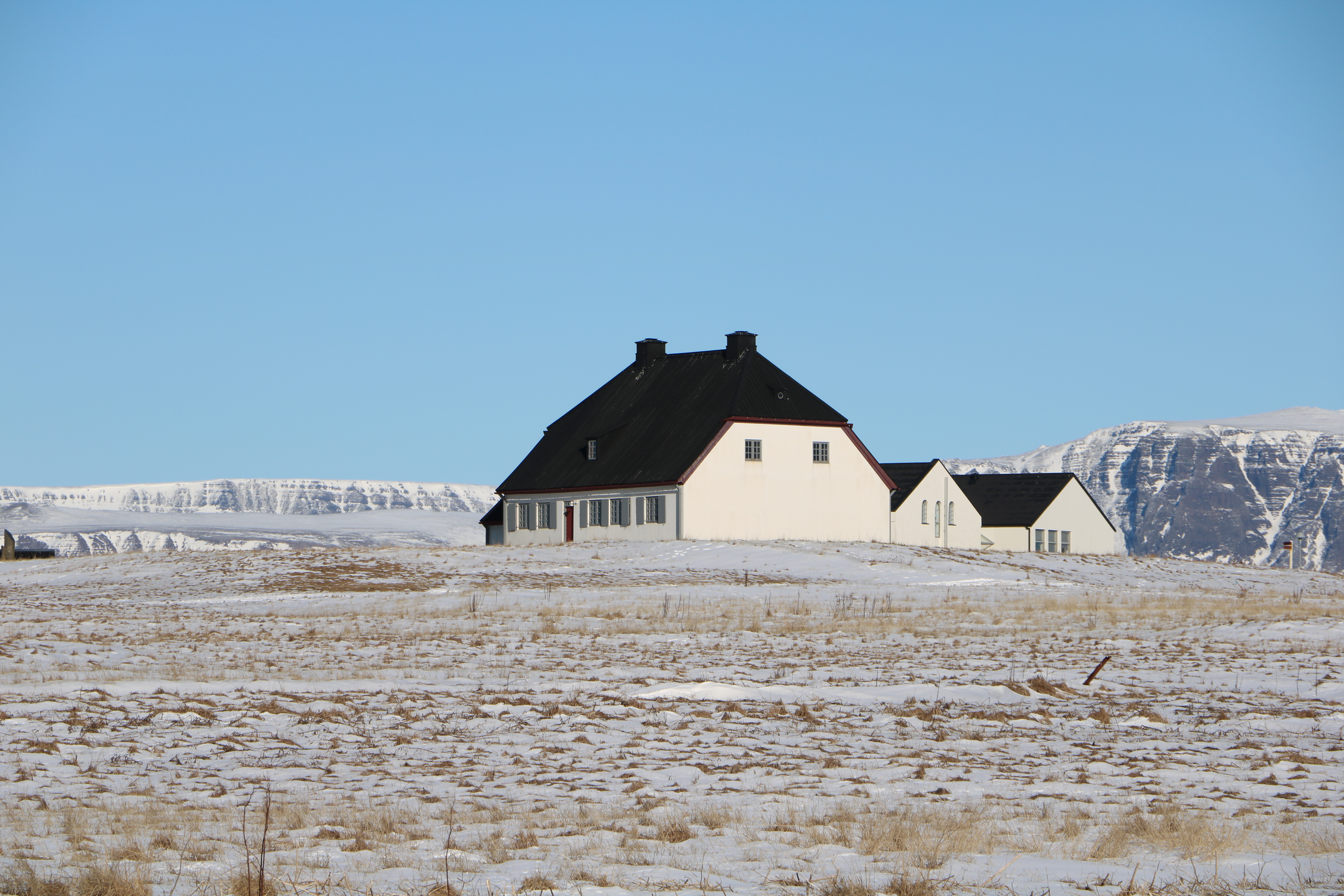
Nesstofa during the winter 2019–2020.

Seltjarnarnes (Icelandic pronunciation: [ˈsɛlˌtʰja(r)tnarˌnɛːs]) is a town and municipality in the Capital Region of Iceland. The municipality is located on a peninsula, bordered only by Reykjavík to the east.

It took on its current political form shortly after the Second World War and was formally created as a township in 1947. It is the smallest Icelandic township by land. The municipality's small land size relative to its population makes it Iceland's most densely populated municipality.

== Overview ==
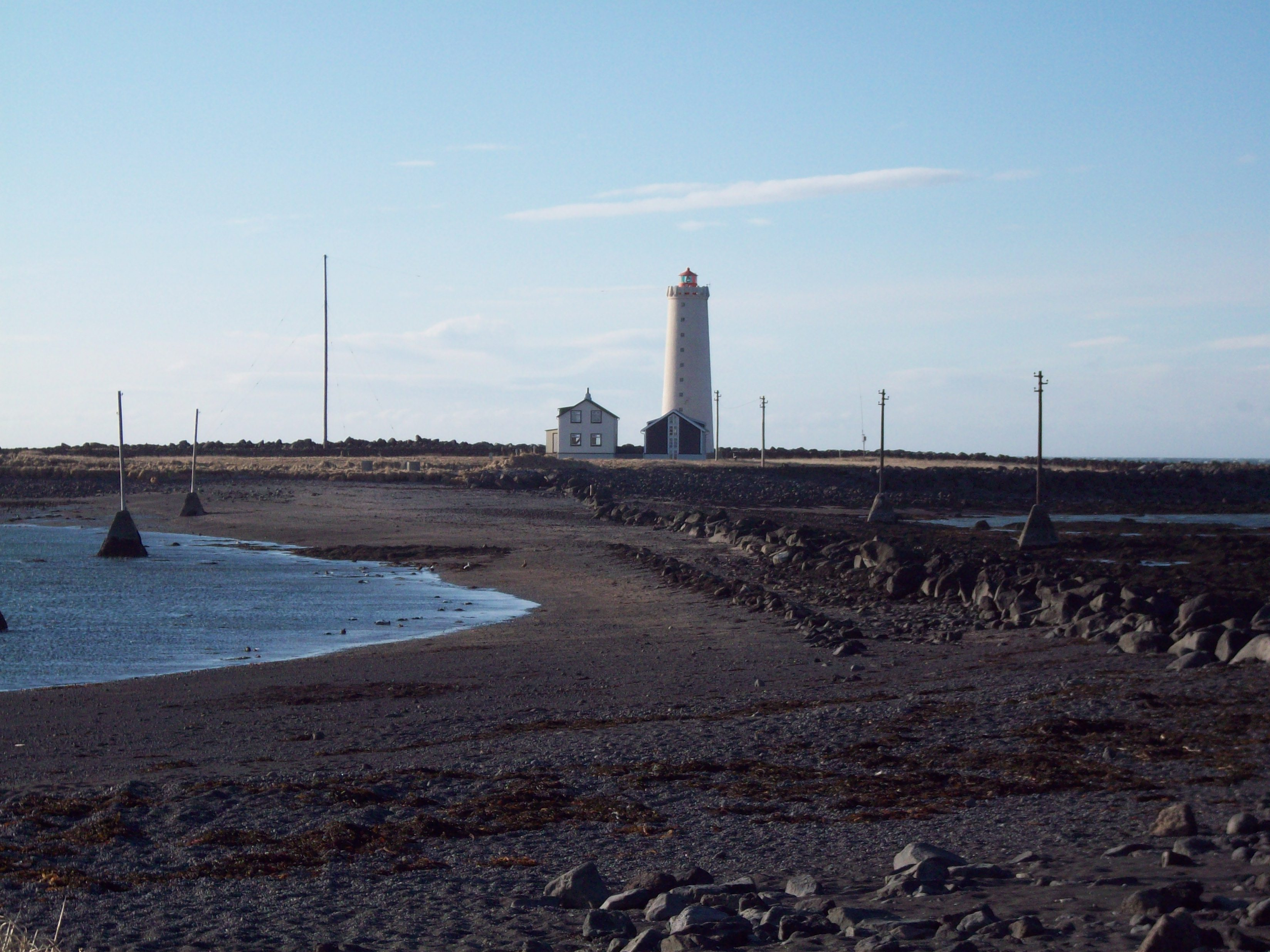
Grótta, a tied island that becomes an island during high tide.

There are two schools in Seltjarnarnes, Mýrarhúsaskóli and Valhúsaskóli.

The Independence Party has had an overall control in the town's council since proper elections started in 1962. First Lady of Iceland Guðrún Katrín Þorbergsdóttir held a position in the city council for 16 years. In the last elections in 2014, the party received 52,6% of the votes and 4 out of 7 members of the council. Other parties represented in the town council are Samfylkingin with 2 members and Neslistinn with one member. The mayor is Þór Sigurgeirsson.

Seltjarnarnes became the world's first town where every citizen had access to fiber optics in 2007.

== Demographics ==
Historical population

Year	Pop.	±%
1901	491	—
1910	440	−10.4%
1920	440	+0.0%
1930	1,062	+141.4%
1940	627	−41.0%
1950	686	+9.4%
1960	1,310	+91.0%

Year	Pop.	±%
1970	2,153	+64.4%
1980	3,100	+44.0%
1990	4,143	+33.6%
2000	4,665	+12.6%
2010	4,395	−5.8%
2020	4,593	+4.5%

Source: Statistics Iceland

== Sports ==
The local football team Grótta play in Iceland's third level division. Grótta's handball teams play in Iceland's top division. Grótta's women's team were Icelandic champions in 2015 and 2016. Grótta also has gymnastics and weight-lifting.

== Notable people ==
- Jon von Tetzchner, founder of Opera and Vivaldi web browsers.
- Unnur Birna Vilhjálmsdóttir, lawyer, actress and Miss World 2005.

== Twin towns – sister cities ==
Seltjarnarnes is twinned with:

- Lieto, Finland
- Nesodden, Norway
- Herlev, Denmark
- Höganäs, Sweden

== Transport links ==
Seltjarnarnes is connected to the bus network of Strætó. Also the Borgarlína network, a BRT-system connecting Reykjavik and surrounding area, is under construction.
