= Valhúsaskóli =

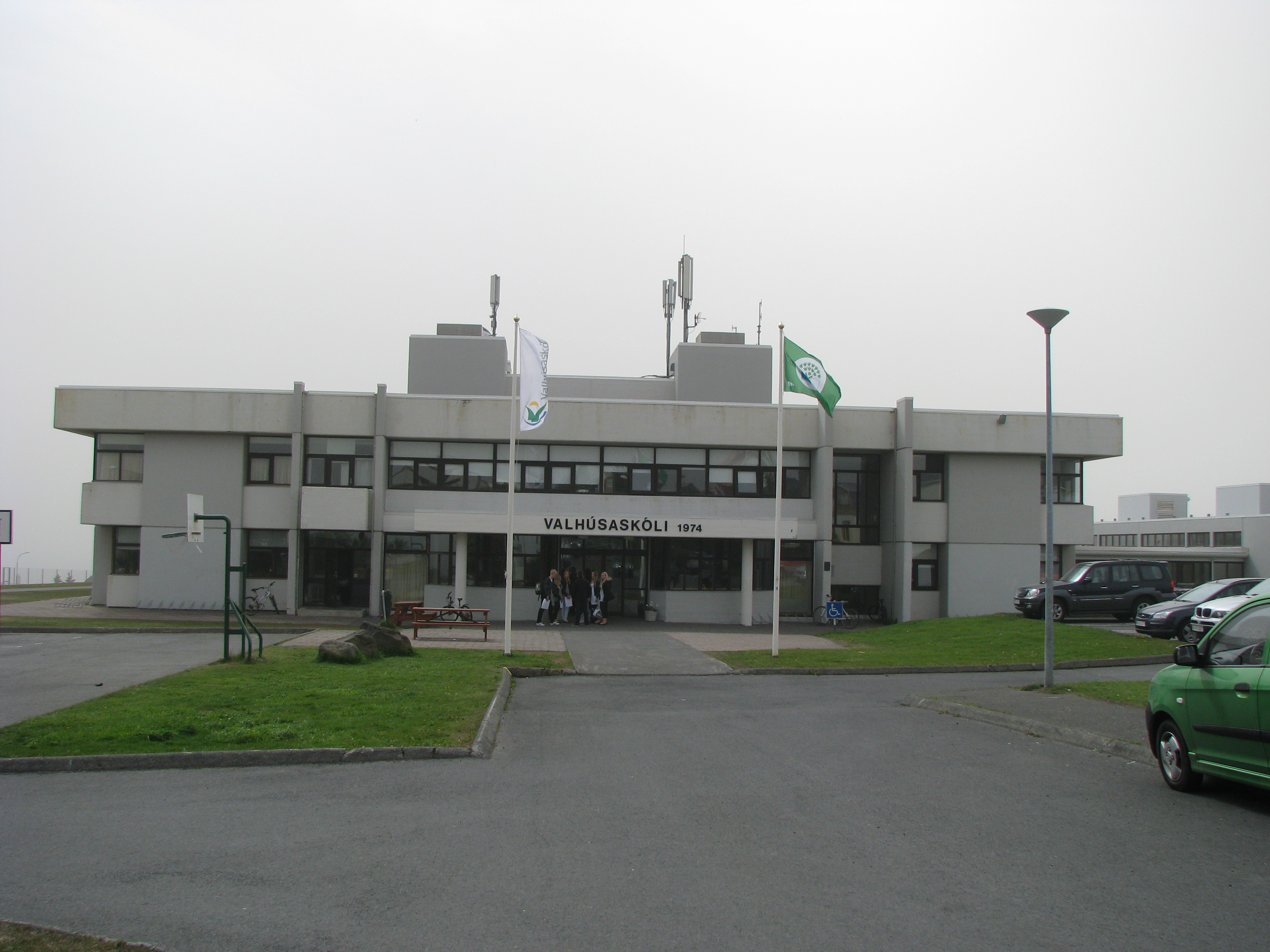

Location
- Skólabraut; Seltjarnarnes IS-170; Iceland
- Coordinates: 64°09′04″N 21°59′45″W

Information
- Funding type: public
- Established: 1974; 52 years ago
- Faculty: around 30
- Age range: 12-16
- Nickname: Való
- Alumni: Valhýsingar
- Website: grunnskoli.seltjarnarnes.is (in Icelandic)

Valhúsaskóli, commonly referred to as Való, is a middle school located in Seltjarnarnes, Iceland.

Valhúsaskóli enrolls students grades 7–10.
