= My Opera =

- Website type: Social networking, email, help desk
- Available in: 19 languages
- Owner: Opera Software ASA
- Website: my.opera.com
- Commercial: No
- Registration: Yes
- Launched: August 2001
- Current status: Defunct since 3 March 2014

My Opera was the virtual community for Opera web browser users. It belonged to Opera Software ASA. In addition to being a support site for the Opera browser, My Opera worked like a social networking site. It offered services such as blogs, photo albums, the free email service My Opera Mail and more. My Opera was closed down on March 3, 2014.

== History ==
The My Opera Community was launched in August 2001 as a simple support site for the browser, and the website had its first upgrade a month later on September 11. On December 15, 2003, the website underwent an upgrade that allowed users to access more features.

In September 2005, the My Opera Community added major improvements. During this upgrade, users were given access to photo albums, improved blogs (formerly journals), the ability to create custom groups, and 300MB of free storage space. Improvements to blogging included the introduction of "mobile blogging" or blogging from a mobile phone through MMS.

On March 8, 2007, Opera released a new version of the site.

The new hardware for the 2006 upgrade was put to use for a beta test website on October 26, 2006. This website was intended to remain up even after the final install of the new hardware on the regular website. There are extensive plans for various subdomains on the My Opera site.

On April 7, 2011, Opera released a free email service for all existing and new-joining My Opera users called My Opera Mail and powered by Opera's FastMail.FM email platform.

On October 31, 2013, the administrators of My Opera announced that the site would be closed down in March 2014. The reasons given included the increased labor required to maintain the My Opera site and the growing popularity of alternative social media sites that provide a better service than the Opera team was able or willing to provide.

== Services ==
A My Opera account was required to use the services. Every My Opera user got 2 GB of space for file storage.

- Blogs: in September 2005, personal "Journal" service was changed to a blog service. Blogs were customised according to user's individual requirements. Blogs could also be updated with a mobile phone. A list of new blog posts, new comments and popular blogs was available.
- Feature groups: it was a way for meeting and socializing with people who shared similar interests. Each group had its own forum, blog and photo section where members could post.
- Members: it was a section where users of My Opera could see logged in members, as well as, a list of members by country.
- My Opera Mail: a free email account, similar to Gmail, Yahoo! Mail or Outlook.com. Accounts included 1 GB of storage, but this was separate from the My Opera 2 GB storage. It was compatible with POP and IMAP email retrieval protocols as well as XMPP instant messaging.
- News Portal: a site with customizable news feeds. It included the Google search engine.
- Photos: a section where users could publish and share their photos with other members.

== Current Opera services available ==
There are several Opera subdomain sites that use an Opera account. These include:

- Opera forums: users of Opera can find help to solve problems related to the browser here. Previously, Opera forums belonged to the My Opera site. In March 2014, the Opera forums were moved to the official Opera web browser site.
- Dev.Opera: a site for developers to write articles and share tips and tricks.
- Opera Link: to administrate the synchronized bookmarks, notes and Speed Dial links for Opera browsers on different devices.
- Opera Add-ons: the domain which contains the extension and theme catalogs.

== Vivaldi.net ==
Vivaldi.net is an alternative community site opened on 18 December 2013 by Jon von Tetzchner, founder and former CEO of Opera Software. Jon von Tetzchner posted a personal welcome message where he explained his plan to provide a new community for My Opera's members. Vivaldi.net offers its members features and services such as blogs, e-mail service, photo albums and forums. Vivaldi.net is not related to Opera Software; it eventually become the virtual community of the eponymous Vivaldi web browser. A Vivaldi.net account is required for using the synchronization features of the browser.
