= Tetschner =

Origin
- Language: German
- Meaning: "(person) from Tetschen"
- Region of origin: Central Europe

Tetschner or Tetzschner (the Anglicized spelling Tetzchner is also used by some) is a German surname, which means "from Tetschen" (that is, modern Děčín) in northern Bohemia. The surname is mostly found in Central Europe including Germany, but also in Denmark and Norway.

== People ==
- Michael Tetzschner, Norwegian conservative politician
- Jon Stephenson von Tetzchner, Norwegian-Icelandic Internet entrepreneur
- Stephen von Tetzchner, Norwegian child psychologist
