= Marta Pizarro Véliz =

Chilean educator

Marta Pizarro Véliz was a prominent Chilean educator who devoted most of her pedagogical career investigating, recommending and improving standards in elementary education in Chile and in Latin America.

She was born in La Serena, Chile and was a star-pupil of the Escuela Normal de la Serena. In 1929 she began her career teaching at the Escuela Experimental Dalton, and by 1935 she was teaching courses in education and pedagogy. She served as director of the School of Application annexed to Escuela Normal No.2.

In 1953 she was given a major role in a study and report on "Reforming the Programs of Rural Education". In 1961 she joined the Latin American Centre of Education Specialist sponsored by the University of Chile. Her outstanding contributions and work in this organisation won her attention from UNESCO, for which she worked as an education expert in the 1960s.

Pizarro had a significant role in teacher training programmes and standards in elementary education in Chile. Her outstanding work was also influential in the improvement of primary education in other developing countries with large rural populations, primarily in Colombia. Her work between 1962 and 1965 focused primarily in the formation of teachers as part of a broader project designed to extend and improve standards in rural education in Colombia.
