= Carissa Véliz =

Mexican-Spanish philosopher

- Born: Mexico
- Occupation: philosopher

Academic background
- Education: University of Salamanca (BA); Graduate Center, CUNY (MA); University of Oxford (PhD)
- Thesis: On Privacy
- Doctoral advisor: Roger Crisp; Cécile Fabre

Academic work
- Discipline: Philosophy
- Sub-discipline: Philosophy, AI Ethics, applied philosophy, ethics, moral philosophy, political philosophy and practical ethics.
- Institutions: University of Oxford
- Website: www.carissaveliz.com

Carissa Véliz is a Mexican, Spanish, and British philosopher. She is an associate professor of philosophy and ethics at the University of Oxford (Institute for Ethics in AI, Faculty of Philosophy).

== Life and career ==
Carissa Véliz earned a bachelor's degree in philosophy at the University of Salamanca. Later she earned an MA in philosophy at the CUNY Graduate Center. She received a doctorate (PhD) in Philosophy from the University of Oxford, with the doctoral thesis "On Privacy", which concerns the ethics and political philosophy of privacy.

She is an associate professor of philosophy and ethics at the University of Oxford's Institute for Ethics in AI in the Faculty of Philosophy, and a Fellow at Hertford College. Her work and area of specialisation is ethics of artificial intelligence, applied philosophy, ethics, moral philosophy, political philosophy and practical ethics.

In 2020 she published her first book, Privacy Is Power, about the ethics and political philosophy surrounding privacy. It became an Economist Book of the Year.

In 2026 she published her second book, Prophecy, which examines the history of prediction from ancient oracles to modern AI and argues that algorithmic forecasting serves as a tool of power over individuals rather than genuine foresight.

She is also a board member of the Proton Foundation, the majority owner of the Swiss technology firm Proton AG.

== Books ==
=== Privacy Is Power (2020) ===
Privacy Is Power: Why and How You Should Take Back Control of Your Data was first published in 2020 by Bantam Press (an imprint of Transworld/Penguin Random House) in the United Kingdom, and in 2021 by Melville House in the United States. The book argues that personal data collection by corporations and governments constitutes a threat to individual autonomy and democracy, and calls for structural reform of the data economy rather than relying solely on individual action. It was named an Economist Book of the Year and has been translated into seven languages.

Kirkus Reviews called it a powerful call for technological liberation meriting the attention of every consumer of digital services. Hannah Fry, author of Hello World, described it as "an essential guide to one of the most pressing modern issues." Newsweek described the book as a meticulous exploration of the ethics of how corporations and governments exploit data. Public Books wrote that the book is essential reading for anyone uneasy about the creeping digitalization of human life and eroding expectations of privacy. Roger McNamee, author of Zucked, called it "brilliant", writing that no one explains the issues and opportunities in privacy better than Véliz.

=== Prophecy (2026) ===
Prophecy: Prediction, Power, and the Fight for the Future, from Ancient Oracles to AI was published on 21 April 2026 by Doubleday (New York), and on 7 May 2026 by Swift Press (London). The book traces the history of prediction from ancient oracles to modern algorithmic forecasting, arguing that the primary function of prophecy has always been power over others rather than genuine knowledge of the future. Véliz contends that AI-driven prediction systems — governing access to loans, jobs, housing, and healthcare — strip individuals of agency and pose a threat to democracy.

The Wall Street Journal described it as witty, surprising, lively, and rousing, calling it a book that "can expand our sense of possibility." Kirkus Reviews gave it a starred review, calling it "a sharp, engaging, and often unsettling meditation on humanity's enduring hunger to know—and control—the future." Publishers Weekly also awarded it a starred review, describing it as "lively and erudite." Timothy Snyder, author of On Tyranny, wrote that the book represents exactly the philosophy society needs to navigate the age of AI. Christopher Wylie, the Cambridge Analytica whistleblower, described it as a stark warning about the charade of technological prophecy and the need to reclaim human agency. Maria Ressa, Nobel Peace Prize laureate, urged readers to engage with the book before algorithms determine what futures are available to them.
