= LiveKit =

American technology company

- Type: Private
- Industry: Artificial intelligence
- Founded: 2021
- Founders: Russ d'Sa (CEO); David Zhao (CTO)
- Headquarters: San Francisco, CA, USA
- Website: livekit.com

LiveKit is an American technology company that provides software for building voice, video, and physical AI agents, along with cloud infrastructure. The company is based in San Francisco, California.

== History ==
LiveKit was founded in 2021 by David Zhao and Russ d'Sa, who is chief executive officer. It began as an open-source project for developers, to simplify the process of building real-time audio and video applications (to transmit audio and video to users in real time), using the WebRTC protocol. D'Sa and Zhao then turned the open-source project into a company, expanding it and creating a cloud version.

Shortly after OpenAI's launch of ChatGPT, d'Sa created a demo of a voice interface with the chatbot, using LiveKit's technology, which led to a deal between the two companies to use LiveKit Cloud for ChatGPT's voice modes. The software underpins Visio, a video conferencing tool built by the government of France. In iOS 18, LiveKit is embedded into FaceTime for emergency calls.

== Technology ==
The company provides software and services for building and running voice, video, and physical AI agents. It also provides network infrastructure hosted on cloud providers, for services like audio streaming. LiveKit transfers audio to an AI model, which converts the audio to text, processes it through a language model, and converts the response to speech. Its Agent Framework allows developers to attach Python or Node.js programs to LiveKit rooms as participants, to enable activities such as voice processing.

== Funding ==
In December 2021, LiveKit announced a $7 million seed round led by Redpoint Ventures, followed by an additional $8 million seed round in 2022. In June 2024, LiveKit raised $22 million in series A funding led by Altimeter Capital. In April 2025, LiveKit raised $45 million in a series B funding round led by Altimeter, at a $345 million valuation. In January 2026, LiveKit raised $100 million in a series C funding round led by Index Ventures, bringing its total amount raised to $183 million and valuing the company at $1 billion.
