= Jon Stephenson von Tetzchner =

Icelandic businessman (born 1967)

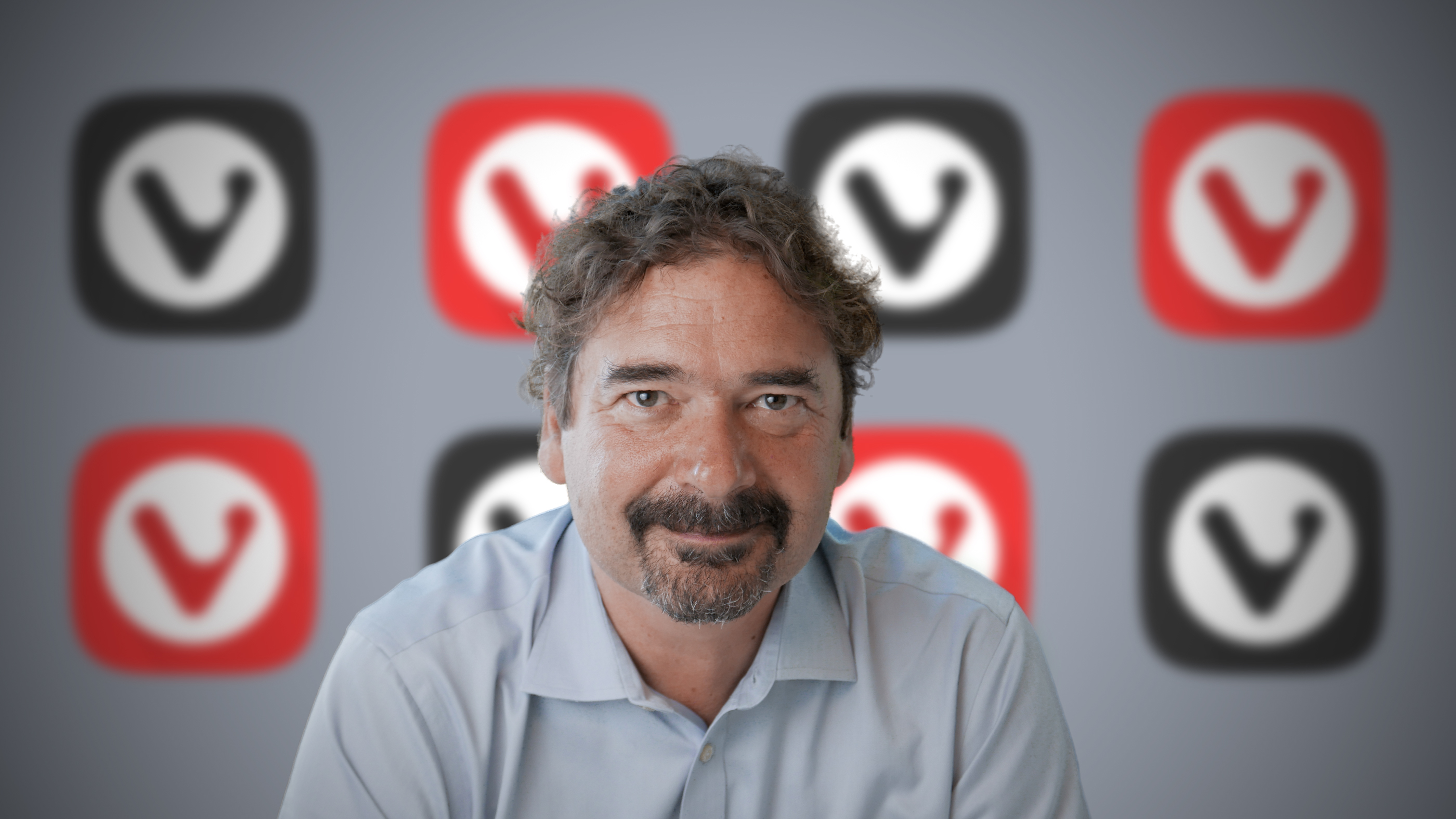
- Tetzchner in front of Vivaldi browser logos
- Born: 29 August 1967 (age 58); Seltjarnarnes, Iceland
- Occupations: Co-Founder & CEO of Vivaldi Technologies, Entrepreneur

Jon Stephenson von Tetzchner (Icelandic: Jón; born 29 August 1967 in Seltjarnarnes) is an Icelandic-Norwegian programmer and businessman. He is the co-founder and CEO of Vivaldi Technologies. Before starting the Vivaldi Web browser, he launched a community site called Vivaldi.net. Tetzchner is also a co-founder and former CEO of Opera Software.

== Early life ==
Jon Stephenson von Tetzchner is the son of the Icelander Elsa Jónsdóttir and the Norwegian Stephen von Tetzchner, a professor of psychology (and the brother of politician Michael Tetzschner). Jon Stephenson grew up around Skólabraut in the town of Seltjarnarnes with his grandparents, the doctor Jón Gunnlaugsson and Selma Kaldalóns, the daughter of the doctor and composer Sigvaldi Kaldalóns. Tetzchner went to secondary school at Menntaskólinn í Reykjavík before continuing his studies in Norway, where he made his career.

Tetzchner holds a master's degree in computer science from the University of Oslo.

== Opera Software ==
Tetzchner worked at the Norwegian state phone company (now known as Telenor) from 1991 to 1995. There, he and Geir Ivarsøy developed browsing software called MultiTorg Opera. The project was abandoned by Telenor, but Ivarsøy and von Tetzchner obtained the rights to the software, formed a company named Opera Software in 1995 and continued working on the Opera browser. In 1996 it was offered for sale to the public.

On 21 April 2005, Tetzchner proclaimed at an internal meeting of Opera Software that if the download numbers of the browser's new version Opera 8 reached one million within four days, he would swim across the Atlantic Ocean from Norway to the United States. Two days later, on the 23rd, the downloads reached 1,050,000 and Tetzchner had to fulfill his challenge. The Opera site covered the swim and his quick failure.

Under his leadership, Tetzchner turned Opera Software into a global company with more than 750 employees in 13 countries. Opera Software was an early pioneer in mobile web browser and more than 350 million people use Opera.

In January 2010, Tetzchner stepped down as Chief Executive Officer of Opera Software, but he continued to serve the company as a strategic adviser.

In June 2011, Tetzchner announced that he was leaving Opera Software over disagreements with management.

== Vivaldi Technologies ==
In December 2013, Tetzchner founded the company Vivaldi Technologies and launched the online community site vivaldi.net, which includes a forum, blogs, chat, photo sharing and a free email service named Vivaldi Webmail.

On 27 January 2015, Vivaldi Technologies announced the release of its new web browser Vivaldi. Its 1.0 version came out in April 2016. Vivaldi is self-funded.
