= Proton AG =

Swiss technology company

- Logo used since 2022
- Formerly: Proton Technologies AG
- Type: Private
- Industry: Software
- Founded: 16 May 2014; 12 years ago
- Founders: Andy Yen; Jason Stockman; Wei Sun
- Headquarters: Plan-les-Ouates, Geneva, Switzerland
- Area served: Worldwide
- Key people: Andy Yen (CEO); Bart Butler (CTO); Tim Berners-Lee (Advisor)
- Products: Proton Mail; Proton VPN; Proton Calendar; Proton Drive; Proton Pass; Proton Wallet; Proton Authenticator; Proton Docs; Proton Sheets; Lumo AI; Proton Meet; Standard Notes
- Owner: Proton Foundation
- Number of employees: 500 (2024)
- Subsidiaries: SimpleLogin; Standard Notes
- ASN: 62371
- Website: proton.me protonmailrmez3lotccipshtkleegetolb73fuirgj7r4o4vfu7ozyd.onion ^{(Accessing link help)}

Proton AG is a Swiss for-profit technology company offering privacy-focused online services and software. It is primarily owned by the non-profit Proton Foundation as a shareholder. The company was formerly known as Proton Technologies.

== Products ==
=== Proton Mail ===
Proton Mail was released as a public beta on 16 May 2014 as an end-to-end encrypted email service after a year of crowdfunding. Proton Mail 2.0 was released on 14 August 2015, with open-source front-end clients and a rewritten codebase.

=== Proton VPN ===
After over a year of crowdfunding, Proton Mail released Proton VPN on 22 May 2017, a secure VPN service provider. It has a no-logging policy, DNS and WebRTC IP address leakage prevention. It is accessible online through Tor, the clearnet, and its mobile applications. On 21 January 2020, Proton announced that Proton VPN would now be open source, to allow independent security experts to analyze it, becoming the first VPN service to do so, simultaneously announcing that an independent security audit had been conducted. On 1 May 2020, Proton VPN reported that they had a total of 809 servers, located in 50 different countries, all owned and operated by the company. By 19 February 2025, the company had a total of 11,496 servers, located in 117 countries, with all new and preexisting servers operated and owned by Proton.

=== Proton Calendar ===
Proton Calendar is an online end-to-end encrypted (Note: Time and date metadata is not encrypted so email reminders and push notifications function properly.) calendar native app and website.

=== Standard Notes ===
Standard Notes is an end-to-end encrypted note-taking application, which was announced to be acquired by Proton on 10 April 2024.

=== Proton Drive ===
Proton Drive is a cloud storage solution with end-to-end encryption, launched in September 2022 after being in beta testing since 2020. On 3 July 2024, Proton launched Proton Docs for editing documents in Proton Drive in collaboration with the Standard Notes team. On 4 December 2025, they added spreadsheet support with Proton Sheets.

=== Lumo AI ===
In July 2025, Proton launched Lumo, an AI chatbot that stores chat logs in encrypted storage. Proton stated that user data in Lumo is not used to train AI models. Lumo can search the internet using "privacy-friendly" search engines, and can analyse user uploaded or Proton Drive files. Lumo is operated from German and Norwegian data centres.

=== SimpleLogin ===
SimpleLogin logo

SimpleLogin is an open-source email alias service that allows users to use email aliases to protect their main inbox from spam and phishing attacks. SimpleLogin also provides additional security features such as PGP encryption and two-factor authentication on various platforms including the web, mobile apps and browser extensions. After being acquired by Proton in early 2022, SimpleLogin functionality was integrated into Proton Mail, Proton Pass, and the rest of the Proton ecosystem.

=== Proton Pass ===
Released in public beta on 20 April 2023, Proton Pass is a cloud-based password manager solution with end-to-end encryption. As of 28 June 2023, it is available to all Proton users. It also allows users to generate email aliases through SimpleLogin.

=== Proton Wallet ===
Proton Wallet is an open-source Bitcoin wallet with end-to-end encryption. The company claims the function to be "self-custodial" where users own their secret keys.

=== Proton Authenticator ===
Proton Authenticator is an open-source and end-to-end encrypted software-based authenticator. When logging into a website or application that supports multi-factor authentication, the user will be prompted for a six-digit one-time password which changes every 30 seconds.

=== Proton Meet ===
Proton Meet is an end-to-end encrypted video calling application launched on 4 September 2025. It was built using LiveKit (Note: WebRTC runs over LiveKit's Cloud) and launched for public access on 31 March 2026.

== Data centers ==
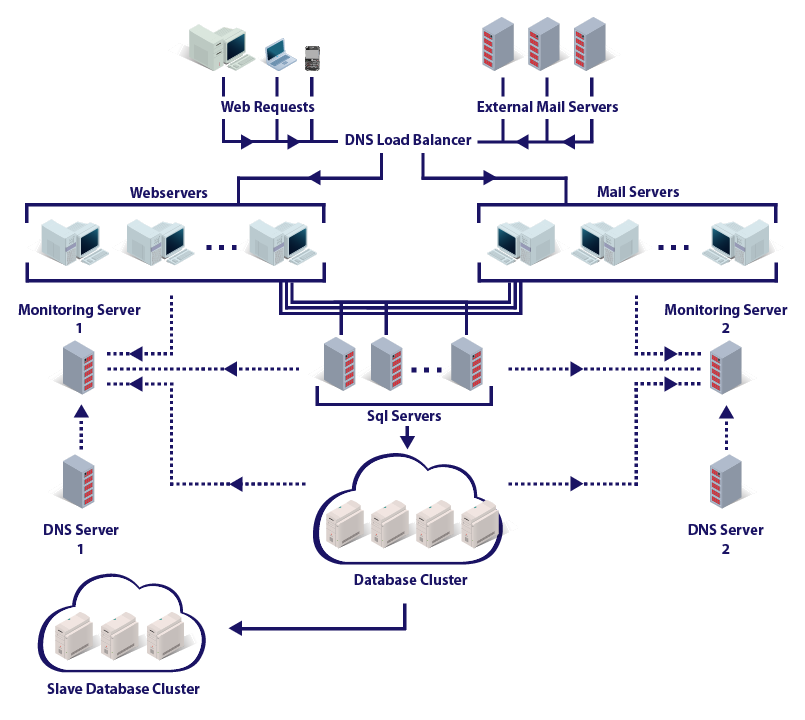
Architecture of a Proton Mail data center

Proton maintains and owns its own server hardware and network in order to avoid utilizing third parties. It maintains two data centers, one in Lausanne and another in Attinghausen (in the former K7 military bunker under 1,000 meters (3,300 ft) of granite rock) as a backup. Each data center uses load balancing across web, mail, and SQL servers, redundant power supply, hard drives with full disk encryption, and exclusive use of Linux and other open-source software. In December 2014, Proton joined the RIPE NCC in an effort to have more direct control over the surrounding Internet infrastructure. As of December 2024, Proton operates data centers in Switzerland, Germany, and Norway.

== Structure ==
Proton is headquartered in Plan-les-Ouates, Geneva, Switzerland.

=== Ownership ===
Since June 2024, the controlling shareholder of Proton AG is the non-profit Proton Foundation. The members of the Proton Foundation board of trustees in June 2024 were Andy Yen, Antonio Gambardella, Carissa Véliz, Tim Berners-Lee and Dingchao Lu.

=== Funding ===
Proton AG was initially funded through crowdfunding and now through paid subscriptions. The company has been partially funded by FONGIT (the Fondation Genevoise pour l'Innovation Technologique) and the European Commission. In March 2021, Proton confirmed that the shares held by Charles Rivers Ventures had been transferred to FONGIT.

=== Acquisitions ===
On 8 April 2022, Proton acquired French email aliasing startup SimpleLogin. Proton has stated SimpleLogin will continue to function as a standalone service and the SimpleLogin team will continue to add new features and functionality. On 12 April 2024, Proton acquired note taking app Standard Notes.

== Public policy positions ==
Proton in 2022 was considered a supporter of the Digital Markets Act. In September 2020, Proton helped found the Coalition for App Fairness, which aims to gain better conditions for the inclusion of their apps in app stores. In 2022, Proton supported the American Innovation and Choice Online Act. In December 2023, Proton's founder publicly vowed to challenge the Australian eSafety Commission in court rather than comply with demands to weaken Proton Mail's privacy features.

In January 2025, Proton was involved in controversy as communications on Proton's social media accounts and Proton's CEO's personal accounts about the Trump administration, as well as the character and policies of the Democratic and Republican parties, were poorly received. In February 2025, in response to Apple's removal of Advanced Data Protection encryption from iCloud in the United Kingdom in response to government demands for a backdoor, Proton published a statement saying that the company would never build an encryption backdoor, and that it wouldn't open a "front door" either by removing end-to-end encryption. In March 2025, the company wrote to the European Commission calling for a "buy European" requirement for public sector procurement in Europe.

In March 2025, Switzerland's government considered amending its surveillance law to expand into new types of monitoring and data collection. The amendment could require VPN services, messaging apps, and social networks to collect user data. Proton's CEO, Andy Yen, stated that the company would leave Switzerland were the law to pass. In June 2025, Proton sued Apple Inc. in U.S. federal court, accusing it of "maintaining an illegal stranglehold on iPhone app distribution and charging excessive commissions to app developers."

== AI Controversy ==
In October 2026, a leaked internal memo showed that the company would reinterview employees about "thoughtful use of AI" which would be "consequential", leading to fears of layoffs. Proton CEO Andy Yen was quoted calling the suggestion of a longer penetration testing period for new features "bullshit and loser thinking. Of course it's possible to be fast and secure", and that engineers should "stop lovingly handcrafting all our code and use AI more". The following day, a leaked internal meeting indicated that re-interviews had been cancelled. Yen apologized and characterized the situation as "a failure of communication", that Proton's "use of AI will never be at the expense of security", and committed to no AI job losses and full transparency into how AI is used at Proton.
