= Proton VPN =

Virtual private network provider

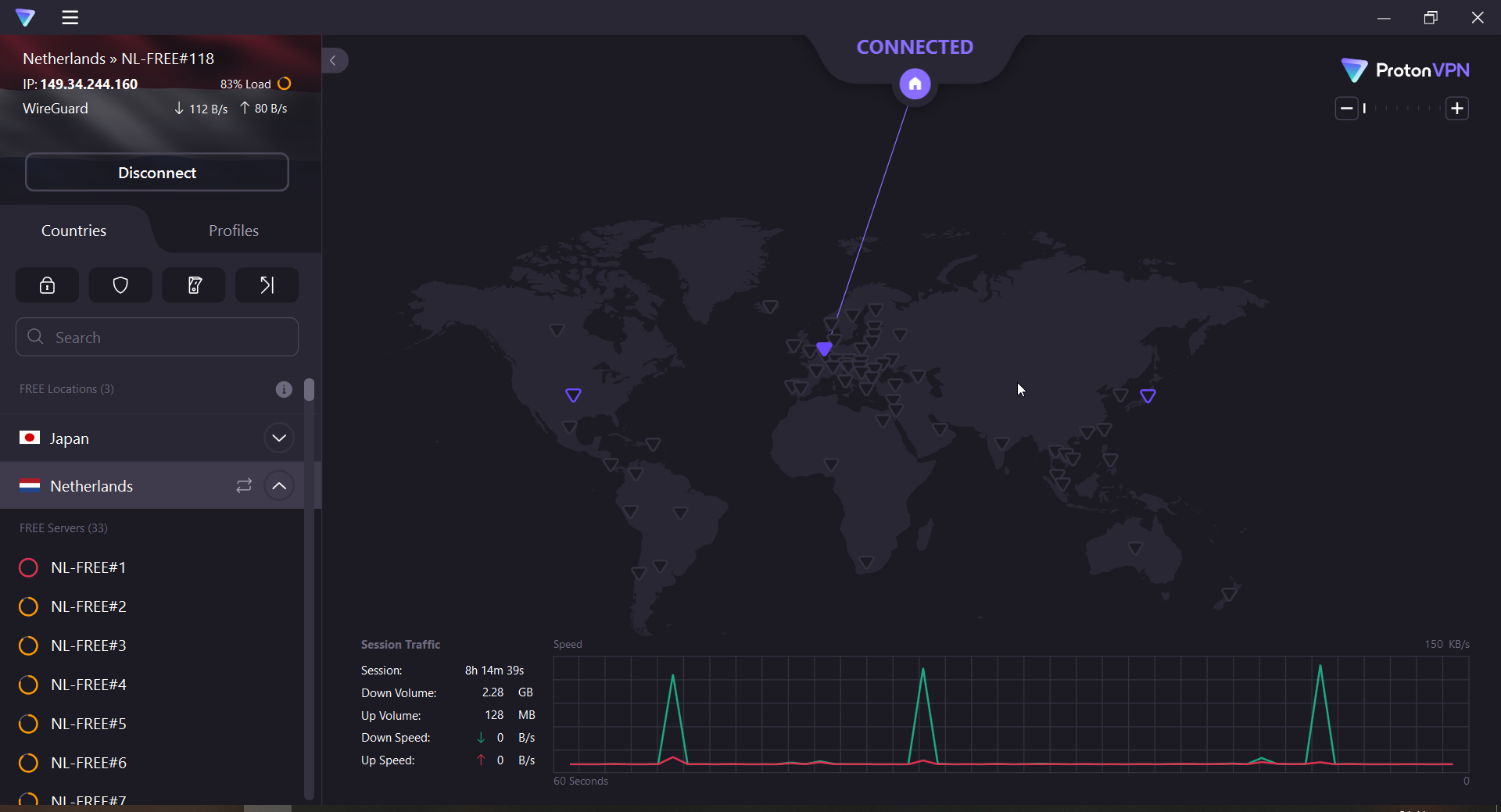
- Windows app screenshot
- Developer: Proton AG

Stable release(s) [±]
- Windows: 4.3.11 / 18 December 2025; 8 months ago
- macOS: 6.1.0 / 5 November 2025; 9 months ago
- Android: 5.15.5.2 / 20 January 2026; 7 months ago
- iOS: 6.6.1 / 20 October 2025; 10 months ago
- Linux (GUI): 4.13.1 / 17 December 2025; 8 months ago
- Linux (CLI): 0.1.4 / 19 January 2026; 7 months ago
- Browser Extension: 1.2.10 / 29 September 2025; 10 months ago
- tvOS: 1.4.0 / 19 December 2025; 8 months ago
- Operating system: Android; ChromeOS; iOS; Linux; macOS; Microsoft Windows; tvOS
- Platform: Personal computer; Smartphone; Wireless Router; Android TV; Apple TV
- Type: Virtual private network
- Website: protonvpn.com
- Repository: github.com/ProtonVPN/

Proton VPN is a VPN service launched in 2017 and operated by the Swiss company Proton AG, the company behind the email service Proton Mail. According to its official website, Proton VPN and Proton Mail share the same management team, offices, and technical resources, and are operated from Proton's headquarters in Plan-les-Ouates. On June 17, 2024, the company announced that it will be transitioning to a non-profit structure under the Proton Foundation.

== Features ==
Proton VPN has a total of 20,681 servers, sited at 191 locations in 148 different nations.

Although Proton VPN owns and operates a portion of their servers, the bulk majority are owned and operated by ASNs such as M247 and Datacamp Limited. Its service is available for Windows, MacOS, Linux, Android, iOS, and ChromeOS and also has a command-line tool for Linux and can be implemented using the IPsec protocol. Proton VPN can also be installed on a wireless router.

Proton VPN utilizes OpenVPN (UDP/TCP), IKEv2, and WireGuard (UDP/TCP) protocols with AES-256 encryption. On October 11, 2022, Proton VPN released their Stealth Protocol for Android, iOS and MacOS clients, designed to disguise VPN traffic as HTTPS traffic. In August 2024, Proton VPN announced that it had also added the Stealth protocol to its Windows client.

Proton VPN has a no-logs policy that was independently audited by Securitum, a European security auditing company.

In January 2020, Proton VPN released its source code on all platforms and had SEC Consult conduct an independent security audit.

In March 2025, Vivaldi integrated Proton VPN into its desktop app, offering the free tier of Proton VPN to all Vivaldi users.

== Reception ==
In a January 2023 review by TechRadar, Proton VPN received 4-1/2 out of 5 stars. A May 2023 PC Magazine review gave Proton VPN a 5-star rating. Proton VPN was awarded their Editor's Choice Award in 2022 and 2023. In October 2023 technology website Engadget rated Proton VPN as the "best overall" for streaming, gaming, privacy and security. In January 2024 a comparative review of 10 different VPNs by German technology magazine CHIP rated Proton VPN as their test winner. In a 2025 TechRadar review of travel VPN services, Proton VPN was ranked second overall and described as the "best VPN for privacy," with emphasis on its Swiss jurisdiction, independent audits, no-logs policy, and advanced security features.

== See also ==
- VPN Services
- Comparison of virtual private network services
- Secure communication
