= Vivaldi (web browser) =

Web browser with built-in email client

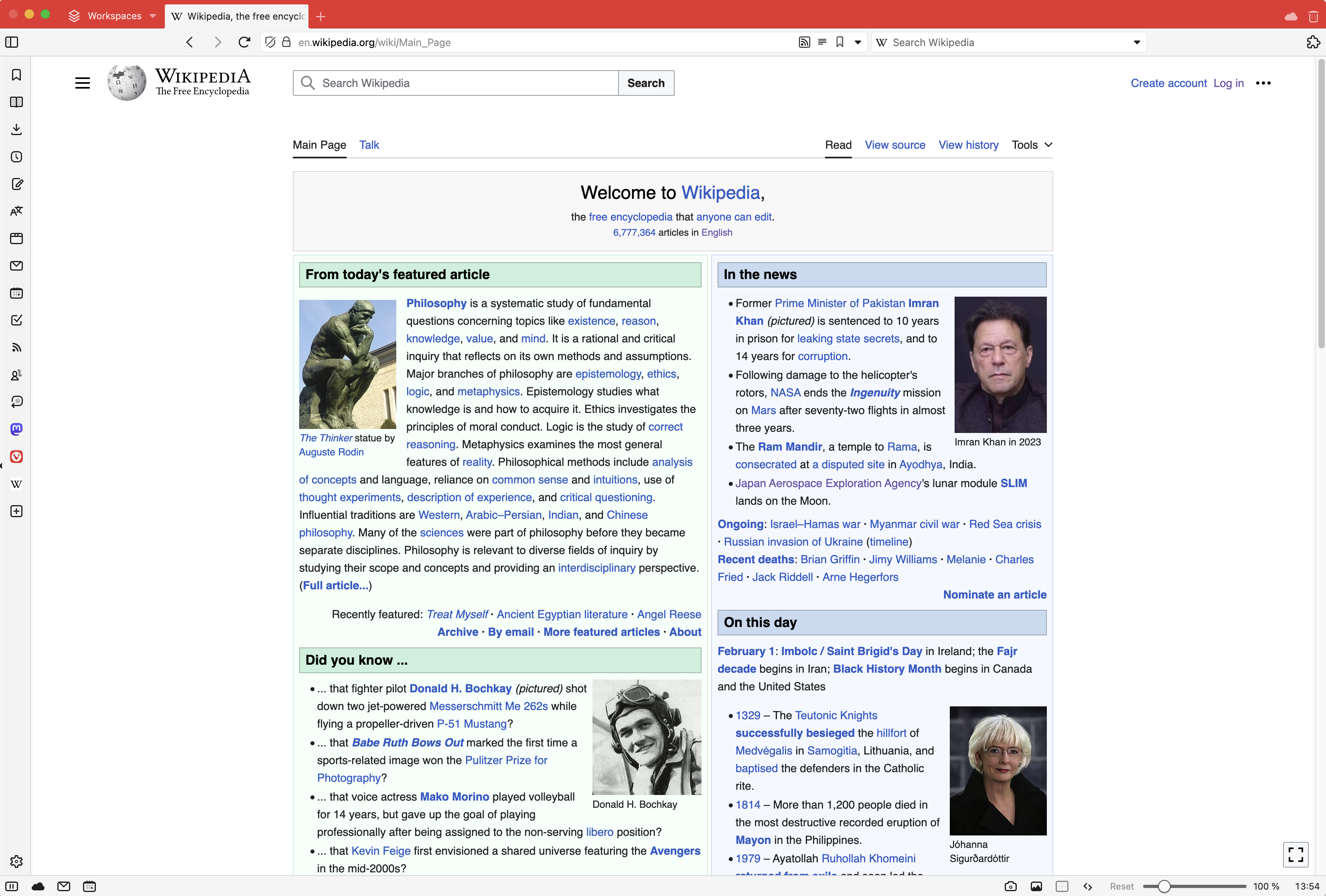
- Vivaldi running on macOS showing the Wikipedia homepage
- Developer: Vivaldi Technologies
- Release: 27 January 2015; 11 years ago

Stable release(s)
- Linux, macOS, Windows: 8.3 (4191.30) / 6 November 2026; 3 days ago
- Android: 8.3 (4192.64) / 6 November 2026; 3 days ago
- iOS, iPadOS: 8.3 (4193.19) / 5 November 2026; 4 days ago

Preview release(s)
- Linux, macOS, Windows: 8.3 (4157.3) / 9 September 2026; 2 months ago
- Android: 8.3 (4161.4) / 15 September 2026; 55 days ago
- iOS, iPadOS: 8.3 (4168.4) / 22 September 2026; 48 days ago
- Written in: C++
- Engines: Blink (WebKit on iOS/iPadOS), V8
- Operating system: Android 10 and later; iOS 18 and later; iPadOS 18 and later; Linux; macOS 13 and later; Windows 10 and later
- Platform: IA-32, x86-64, ARM
- Available in: 53 languages
- List of languages Albanian, Arabic, Armenian, Basque, Belarusian, Bulgarian, Catalan, Chinese (Simplified), Chinese (Traditional), Croatian, Czech, Danish, Dutch, English, Estonian, Finnish, French, Frisian, Galician, Georgian, German, Greek, Hungarian, Icelandic, Ido, Indonesian, Italian, Japanese, Korean, Kurdish, Latvian, Lithuanian, Lojban, Macedonian, Norwegian (Bokmal), Norwegian (Nynorsk), Persian, Polish, Portuguese (Brazil), Portuguese (Portugal), Romanian, Russian, Sardinian, Scots Gaelic, Serbian, Slovak, Slovenian, Spanish, Spanish (Peru), Swedish, Turkish, Ukrainian, Vietnamese
- Type: Web browser
- License: Proprietary freeware (Note: The user interface (UI) layer of the browser is closed-source. The C++ backend and the open-source Chromium codebase used in the browser is released under BSD-3.)
- Website: vivaldi.com
- Repository: vivaldi.com/source

Vivaldi (/vɪˈvɑːldi, vəˈv-/) is a Norwegian-Icelandic freeware, cross-platform web browser with a built-in email client developed by Vivaldi Technologies. The company is employee-owned. Vivaldi was founded by Tatsuki Tomita and Jon Stephenson von Tetzchner, who was the co-founder and CEO of Opera Software. Vivaldi was initially released on 27 January 2015.

Although it is accessible to general users, Vivaldi's design and feature-set primarily targets power users, in addition to former Opera users disgruntled by its transition from the Presto layout engine to a Chromium-based browser, which resulted in the loss of many of its distinctive features. Even though it is also Chromium-based, Vivaldi aims to revive the features of the Presto-based Opera with its own proprietary modifications.

Vivaldi replaced Firefox as the default browser on the Cinnamon Community Edition of the Manjaro Linux distribution. As of March 2026, Vivaldi claims to have 4.0 million active users.

== History ==
Vivaldi began as a virtual community website that replaced My Opera, which was shut down by Opera Software in March 2014. Von Tetzchner was angered by this decision because he believed that this community helped make the Opera web browser what it was. Von Tetzchner then launched the Vivaldi Community—a virtual community focused on providing registered users with a discussion forum, blogging service, and numerous other practical web services—to make up for My Opera's closure.

Later, on 27 January 2015, Vivaldi Technologies launched the first technical preview of the Vivaldi web browser. In the first 10 days of being available, Vivaldi was downloaded 500,000 times, which, according to von Tetzchner, was "a very high number, especially if you consider that it's still a technical preview". The browser's name comes from the Italian composer Antonio Vivaldi, which, according to Tatsuki Tomita, is an easy name to be remembered and understood worldwide.

The first stable release of the browser, version 1.0, was released on 6 April 2016. Initially being available only for Linux, macOS, and Windows, Vivaldi was launched with the intent of giving additional functionality when other browsers on the market at the time tried "their best at simplifying, and streamlining their products", according to Ars Technica.

In September 2021, Vivaldi replaced Firefox as the default browser on the Manjaro Cinnamon Community Edition to a mixed reception from the Linux community, as Vivaldi is not "free and open source software"; Manjaro developers cited this decision on Vivaldi's feature-richness and exceptional customisability. In December 2021, Vivaldi became the first web browser to be available for the Android Automotive operating system used in the Swedish electric vehicle manufacturer Polestar's Polestar 2.

== Features ==
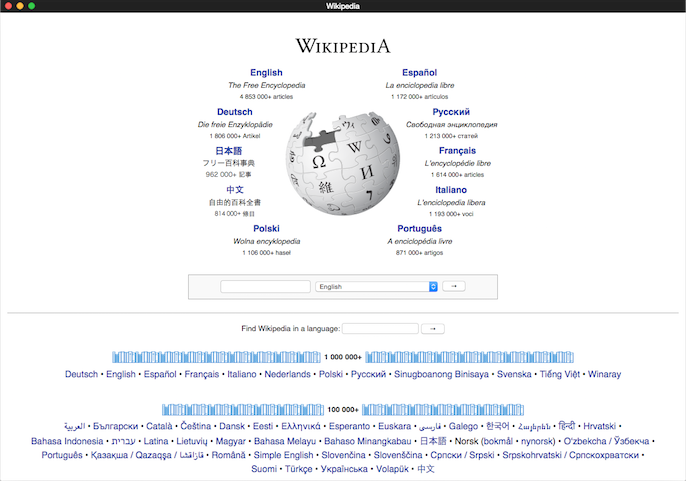
Vivaldi 1.0.228.3 displaying the Wikipedia homepage in its "Chromeless UI" mode

Vivaldi allows user interface customisation such as colours, icons, address bar and tab positioning, start pages and even corner radius rounding. According to CEO Jon von Tetzchner, Vivaldi's unique customisability is how the browser caters to experienced users.

Vivaldi comes with a built-in ad blocker, pop-up blocker and tracker blocker. These features block intrusive ads, help web pages load faster, and protect against malicious ads and trackers. It comes with a built-in e-mail client with IMAP and POP3 support. Some of the mail features are saved searches, offline message search, powerful messages filtering and text formatting. The browser can be used as a feed reader to save RSS and Atom feeds, plus managing them in an easy and direct way using tools like Labels and Flags . It also comes with a built-in calendar to manage events in the browser. The browser also has built-in translation, which is powered by Lingvanex and can instantly translate whole websites or only certain words from them, without the need for third-party extensions.

Vivaldi features the ability to "stack" and "tile" tabs, annotate web pages, and add notes to bookmarks. Furthermore, users can place digital bookmarks on a Speed Dial page for quick access and harness Quick Commands to search bookmarks, browsing history, open tabs, and settings. Vivaldi is built around and based on web technologies such as HTML5, Node.js, React.js, and numerous NPM modules. As of Technical Preview 4, Vivaldi also supports numerous mouse gestures for actions like tab switching and keyboard activation. Vivaldi can also be set to a "Chromeless UI", which gives users more screen real-estate and the ability to focus on a single page without distractions. To accommodate users who prefer to use a large number of tabs at the same time, Vivaldi supports hibernation, aka Tab Hibernation for both individual tabs and for tab stacks, freeing resources while the user does not actively use those tabs.

=== Extensions ===
Vivaldi can use many browser extensions developed for Google Chrome and Firefox (they both use the WebExtensions API), and users can install extensions directly from the Chrome Web Store. Most of these work properly in Vivaldi, except for themes specific to Google Chrome, due to Vivaldi using a unique backend for rendering the UI compared to the typical render for themes used by most Chromium-based browsers.

Support for extensions was limited to the desktop version until September 2026 when 8.2 for Android was released including full extension support.

== Reception ==
Ars Technica reviewer Scott Gilbertson wrote about version 1.0 in April 2016. He praised its innovative features, such as its tab handling, while noting that it will most likely remain a niche browser and not see widespread uptake. In October 2018, Gilbertson gave version 2.0 a very positive review and stated that Vivaldi is now his usual browser and that he would be hard put to go back to a browser without its unique features.

Ghacks editor-in-chief Martin Brinkmann wrote about the privacy of Vivaldi in January 2018. He criticised the lack of an opt-out option for the unique user ID it generates to get general statistics about the browser's userbase, but commented that the unique ID "is easy enough to delete" and "it is different anyway if you use Vivaldi on multiple devices".

TechRadar's managing editor, Desire Athow, published a review of Vivaldi in August 2021. In the review, Athow praised the browser's focus on the productivity, highlighting its advanced tab management features such as tab hibernation, multi-tab management, and split-screen view. However, he also pointed out that Vivaldi's extensive feature set and high degree of customisability can also be overwhelming for a casual user, making it clear that the browser is not designed for everyone.

Wired's senior writer, Scott Gilbertson, reviewed version 4.0 of the browser in June 2021. He praised the high number of customisation options, suggesting it might be the "Emacs of web browsers" for its personalised user experience. Gilbertson highlighted the browser's unique features, including a built-in email client, RSS feed reader, calendar, and translation tools. Additionally, he recommended Vivaldi to users searching for a more tailored and efficient browsing experience, while also praising its performance.

PC World's Staff Writer Michael Crider said in a July 2024 article "After a month, I’m finding that there’s nothing I want to do with Vivaldi that I can’t", but criticised it for not being able to handle multiple tabs without bugs.

== See also ==
- History of the web browser
- List of web browsers
