= Proton Drive =

End-to-end encrypted storage service

- Original author: Andy Yen
- Developer: Proton AG
- Release: November 16, 2020 (paid beta); June 2021 (free beta); September 22, 2022
- Written in: C# Swift; Kotlin
- Website: proton.me/drive; protonmailrmez3lotccipshtkleegetolb73fuirgj7r4o4vfu7ozyd.onion/drive ^{(Accessing link help)}
- Repository: github.com/ProtonDriveApps

Proton Drive is an end-to-end encrypted, cloud-based file storage and synchronization service developed by Proton AG. Proton Drive enables storing files in the cloud, synchronizing files across devices, and sharing files securely. It is accessible through a web application, desktop applications for Windows and macOS, and mobile applications for Android and iOS.

The software is open source and security is independently audited.

== History ==
Proton Drive's development began in 2019, supported by a grant from the European Union's Horizon 2020 research and innovation program.

A beta version of the Proton Drive service was launched to paid Proton subscribers on November 16, 2020, and opened to non-paid users in June 2021.

In October 2021, the Proton Drive web app underwent an independent security audit by Securitum. During August and September 2022, Proton Drive Android and iOS apps were also independently audited by Securitum.

The service exited beta and launched publicly via web app on September 22, 2022, followed by the release of iOS and Android apps on December 7, 2022.

The source code for the Android and iOS apps was open-sourced on March 2, 2023, along with the publication of the security audits.

On May 16, 2023, Proton Drive launched a version control feature that allows users to restore older versions of their files, and launched a Windows app on July 12, 2023. A desktop app for macOS was released on November 23, 2023. A photo backup feature for Android was added on December 7, 2023.

On February 20, 2024, Proton Drive increased the storage limits for its free plan from 1GB to 5GB.

=== Proton Docs & Proton Sheets ===
On July 3, 2024, Proton released Proton Docs in Proton Drive, an end-to-end encrypted, real-time collaborative, document editor feature. In August, the company launched Proton Drive for Business, offering real-time cloud collaboration for teams.

On December 4, 2025, Proton launched Proton Sheets, a companion service for Proton Docs allowing for spreadsheet creation.

== Reception ==
Proton Drive received mixed reviews upon launch. Reviewers noted the low storage limits and lack of features but also noted the high level of security.

After the Windows app launch, Android Police noted,

Proton Drive is finally becoming a viable alternative to Google Drive.

Following the release of the macOS desktop app, Boy Genius Report wrote in November 2023,

Proton Drive is the app that might make me finally switch over from Google.

Subsequent releases and feature updates improved its reception.

Cloudwards commented in July, 2026,

…the size of a free account (up to 1GB) combined with basic sharing and no collaboration make Proton Drive feel light on features. What you trade in productivity, however, you more than make up for in security and privacy.

PCMag remarked in March 2026,

Featuring local and server-side encryption, Proton Drive is a cloud storage and file-sharing application tailor-made for people with strong security and privacy leanings.

In July 2026, PCMag rated Proton Drive the best cloud storage provider for privacy and security.
