= Proton Pass =

Open-source password management software

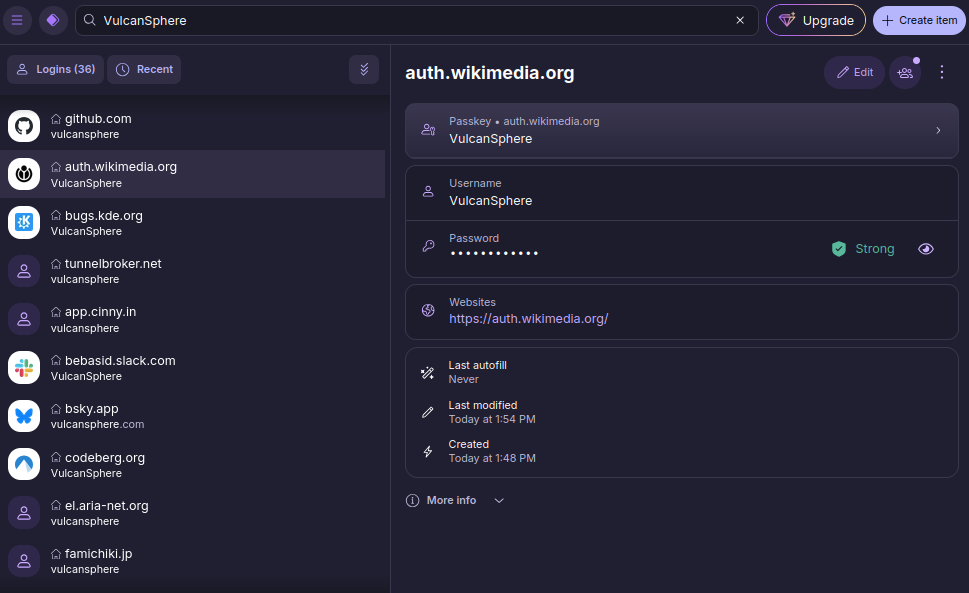
- Screenshot of Proton Pass showing a login record including a passkey
- Original author: Andy Yen
- Developer: Proton AG
- Release: April 20, 2023 (paid beta); June 28, 2023 (full launch)
- Written in: Kotlin (Android), Swift (iOS), Rust (common library)
- Platform: Android, iOS, Linux, macOS, Windows, and web browsers Chrome, Edge, Firefox, Brave, Safari
- Available in: Multilingual
- Type: Password manager
- License: GNU GPLv3
- Website: proton.me/pass
- Repository: github.com/protonpass

Proton Pass is a freemium password manager with open-source clients, developed by the Swiss software company Proton AG.

== Overview ==
Proton Pass can store login credentials, email aliases, credit card data, passkeys, 2FA secret keys, files, and notes in virtual vaults that are encrypted using 256-bit AES-GCM.

Browser extensions are available for Chromium-based browsers (Chrome, Edge, Brave, etc.) and Firefox.

== History ==
Following Proton's acquisition of SimpleLogin, in April 2022, engineers from both companies worked on developing a password manager to release under the Proton brand.

=== 2023 ===
On April 20, 2023, Proton launched a beta version of Proton Pass to a limited audience of existing Proton customers.

On 28 June 2023, Proton Pass was launched globally under a freemium model. Initially, it was available as a browser extension (Chromium-based browsers and Firefox) and as a mobile app (iPhone/iPad and Android).

On 19 July 2023, Proton published the results of its security audit of Proton Pass mobile apps, browser extensions, and API, conducted by Cure53. At the same time, Proton released the source code for Proton Pass under the GNU General Public License v3.0.

On 25 October 2023, Proton announced the addition of a sharing feature to Proton Pass, allowing users to share passwords and other sensitive information with other Proton Pass users, via end-to-end encryption.

=== 2024 ===
On 25 January 2024, Proton announced that paid users would have access to the Proton Sentinel high-security program, which is designed to identify and prevent account takeover attacks.

On 7 February 2024, Proton Pass for Business was launched, with 24/7 business support, increased sharing limits, unlimited vaults and a dedicated admin panel.

On 29 February 2024, Proton announced the launch of the Proton Pass Windows app.

On 21 March 2024, support was added for passkeys. This feature was made available to both free and paid plans.

On 22 April 2024, the Proton Pass Android app became available on F-Droid.

On 6 May 2024, a collection of security features, dubbed Pass Monitor, was launched, which lets users monitor their leaked password, breached email addresses, and password strength warnings from outside sources, including the dark web.

On 6 June 2024, the Proton Pass macOS and Linux desktop apps, and the Safari browser extension were launched.

On 12 July 2024, Proton Pass launched a secure sharing feature for paid plans, which allows users to share credentials and other information with non-Proton Pass users. This is via shared links, which includes limits on the number of clicks and time duration for the link to expire (no longer functional after user set the setting of the shared link).

On 8 August 2024, Proton Pass launched its Identities feature which allows for storing and auto-filling common data such as name, address and telephone phone number. It also introduced biometric authentication.

On 9 October 2024, Proton Pass launched a family plan.

=== 2025 ===
In April 2025, Proton Pass added support for file attachments attached to individual entries within the password manager.

As of November 2025, Proton Pass has the ability to be streamlined via the terminal.

== Reviews ==
Proton Pass launched in 2023 to largely positive reviews, although its minimal feature set was criticized at the time.

Writing for Privacy Journal, Brett Day felt that "[Proton Pass is] a little feature barren, but the tools it offers are of high quality". According to TechCrunch, it is a "solid password manager" despite not being as feature rich as 1Password or other programs, and PCMag stated, "While short on frills, Proton Pass does a perfectly capable job of managing your passwords." In January 2024, PCMag named Proton Pass "Best for no-frills" password manager.

In 2024, TechRadar named Proton Pass the best password manager for privacy, stating that despite its fairly recent release, Proton was still working very hard on its security.

== Security incidents ==
=== 2025 DOM-based Extension Clickjacking ===
Security researcher Marek Tóth presented a vulnerability in browser extensions of several password managers (including ProtonPass) at DEF CON 33 on August 9, 2025. In their default configurations, these extensions were shown to be exposed to a DOM-based extension clickjacking technique, allowing attackers to exfiltrate user data with just a single click. The affected password manager vendors were notified in April 2025. According to Tóth, ProtonPass version 1.31.6 addressed the issue.

== See also ==
- List of password managers
