= List of Dalian landmarks =

Landmarks in Dalian, China

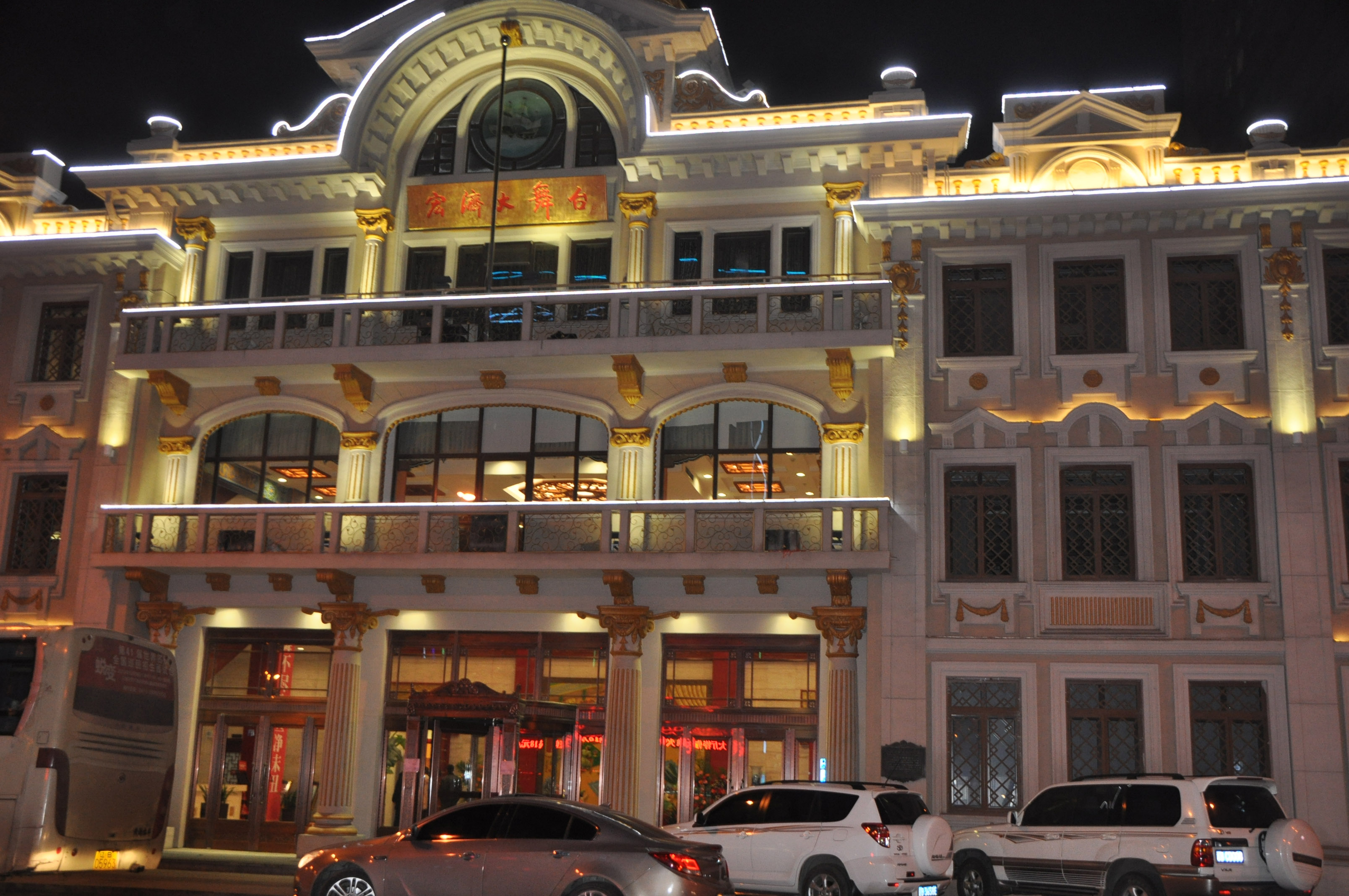
Hongji Grand Stage

Landmarks in Dalian, Liaoning, China, include:

== Buildings and monuments ==
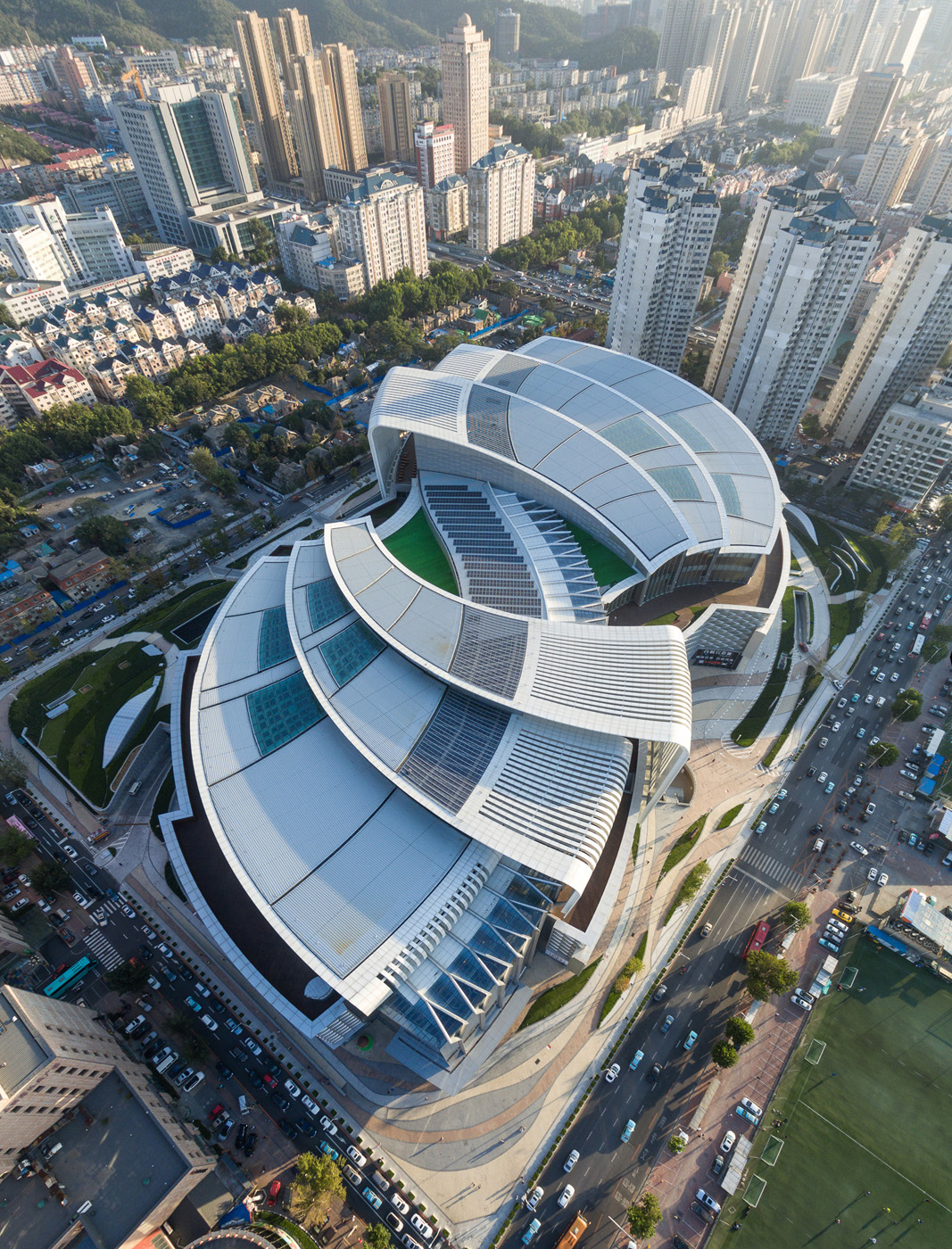
Olympia 66

- Dalian Greenland Center
- Dalian International Trade Center
- Dalian World Trade Center
- Dalian Futures Square 1
- Dalian Zhoushuizi International Airport
- Changhai Airport
- Hongji Grand Stage
- Dalian railway station
- Dalian Sports Centre Stadium
- Jinzhou Stadium
- Olympia 66
- Eton Place Dalian
- Dalian Maple Leaf International School Senior High
- Lushun South Road
- Hongyanhe Nuclear Power Plant

== Religious sites ==
- Dalian Mosque
- Dalian Catholic Church
- Beijing Street Church
- Yuguang Street Church

== Museums ==
- Jinzhou Museum (Dalian)
- Lüshun Museum
- Soviet destroyer Retivy (1939)

== Schools ==
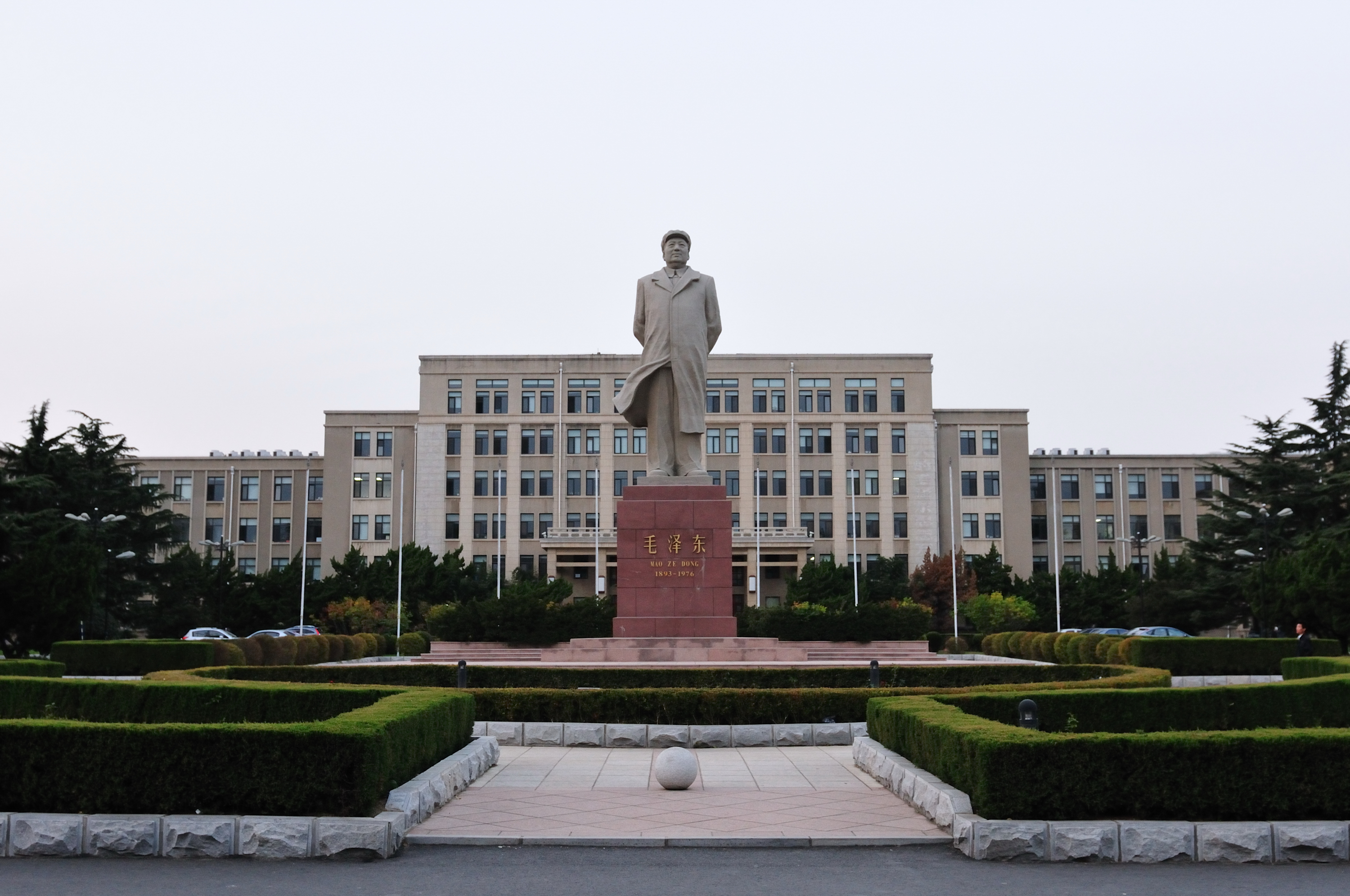
Dalian University of Technology

- Dalian University
- Dalian Medical University
- Dalian Jiaotong University
- Dalian Polytechnic University
- Dalian Institute of Chemical Physics
- Dalian Minzu University
- Dalian Institute of Science and Technology
- Chinese Academy of Sciences
- Dalian University of Technology
- Dongbei University of Finance and Economics
- Dalian University of Foreign Languages
- Dalian Maritime University
- Dalian Ocean University
- Dalian Naval Academy
- Liaoning University of International Business and Economics
- Dalian No. 24 High School
- Dalian No.8 Senior High School
- Dalian Yuming Senior High School
- Dalian Maple Leaf International School Senior High
- Japanese School of Dalian
- Dalian American International School (DAIS)
- Liaoning Normal University

== Parks and gardens ==
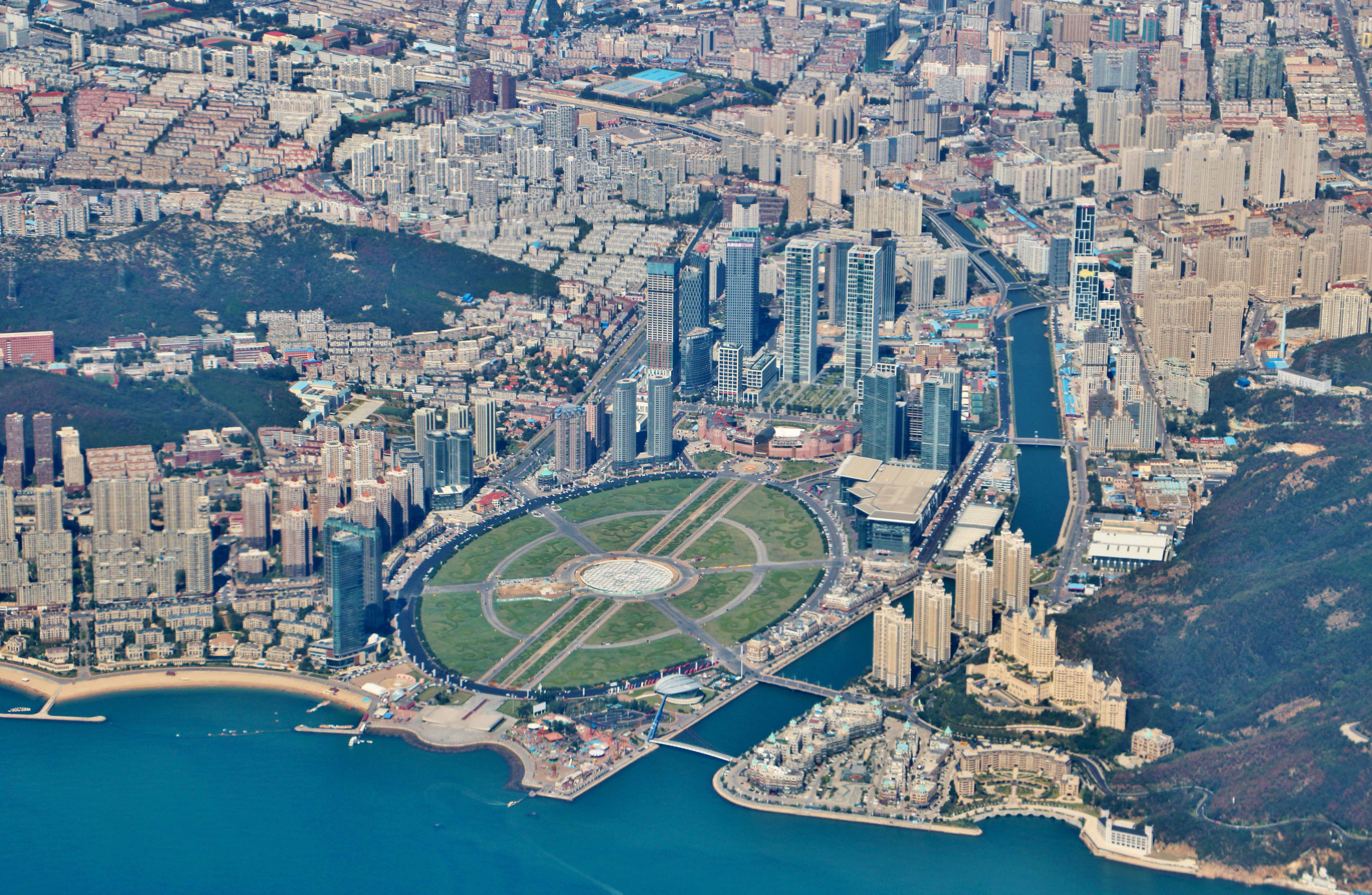
Xinghai Square

- Dalian Laodong Park
- Xinghai Square
  - Xinghai Park
- Zhongshan Park (Dalian)
- Zhongshan Square
  - Dalian People's Culture Club
  - Modern Buildings on Zhongshan Square in Dalian
  - Long Live the Victory of Mao Zedong Thought
- Victory Square (Dalian)
- People's Square
- Dalian Discovery Kingdom
- Longwangtang Cherry Blossom Park

== Shopping, commercial, and industrial districts ==
- Dalian Software Park
- Dalian Hi-tech Zone
- Port of Dalian
- Lüshun Port
- Lüshunkou District
- Xi'an Road Commercial Zone
- Dalian Development Area
- Qingniwaqiao

== Natural ==
- Dalian Bay
- Liaodong Bay
- Changxing Island, Dalian
- Qian Mountains
  - Dahei Mountain
- 203 Hill
- Longwangtang Reservoir
- Bingyu Valley

== See also ==
- Tourism in China
- Dalian
