= List of tallest buildings in Dalian =

Tall buildings in Dalian
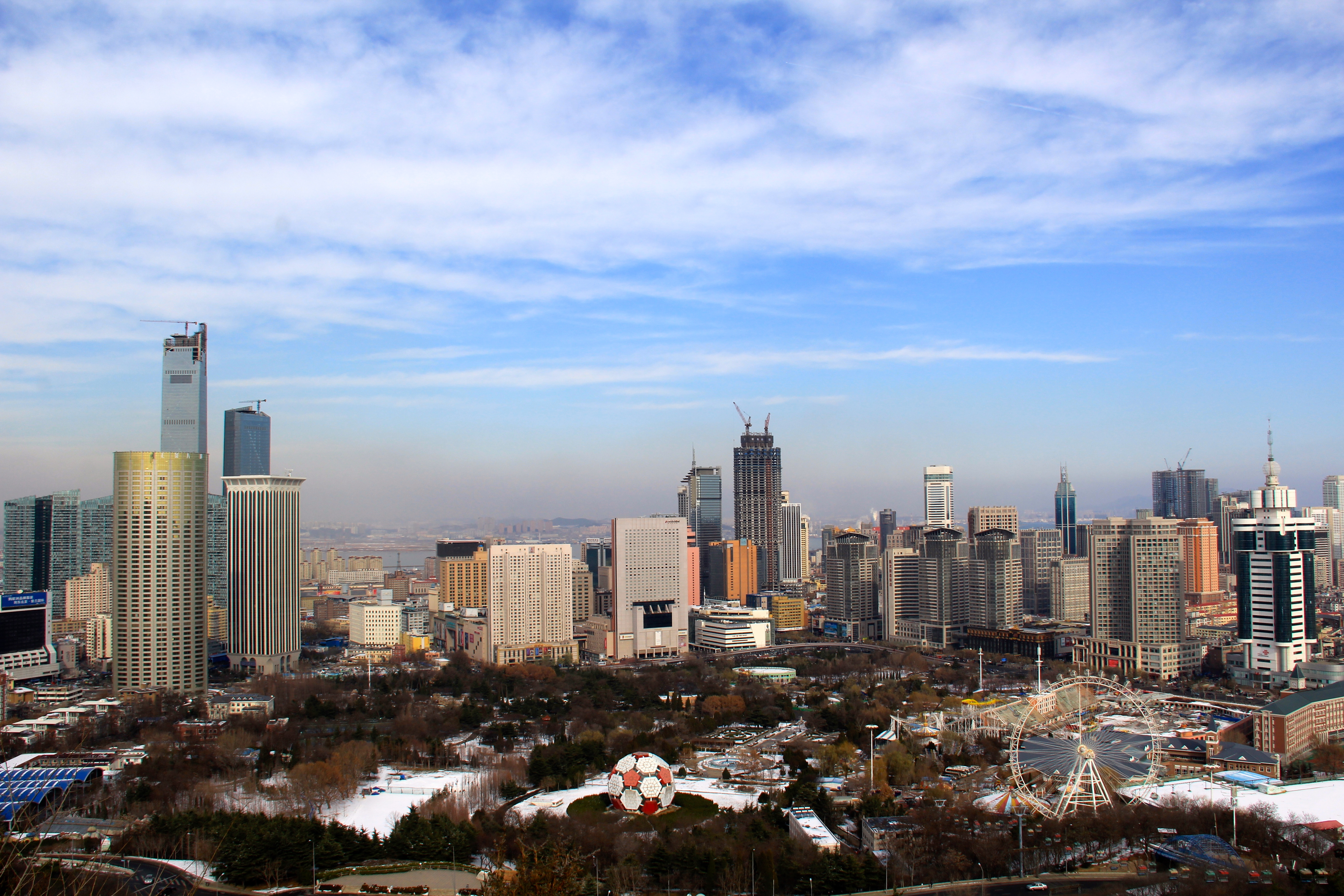
- Skyline of Dalian in 2013
- Tallest building: Eton Place Dalian Tower 1 (2016)
- Tallest building height: 383.2 m (1,257 ft)
- First 150 m+ building: Dalian Telecommunications Center (1996)

Number of tall buildings
- Taller than 150 m (492 ft): 59 (2025)
- Taller than 200 m (656 ft): 30 (2025)
- Taller than 300 m (984 ft): 2

This list of tallest buildings in Dalian ranks skyscrapers in Dalian, Liaoning, China by height. Dalian is a sub-provincial city in Liaoning Province. It is the second largest city in Liaoning and Northeast China after Shenyang, with a population of 6.2 million. The tallest building in Dalian is currently the Eton Place Dalian Tower 1, a supertall skyscraper reaching 383 meters (1,257 feet) in height.

As a port city, Dalian is a major hub in northeastern China. The majority of the city's tallest buildings were built in the 2010s, with construction slowing down in the early 2020s. As of 2025, Dalian has 59 buildings that reach or exceed 150 m (492 ft) in height, 30 of which are taller than 200 m (656 ft). It is the second largest skyline in Liaoning after Shenyang.

== Tallest buildings ==
This lists ranks Dalian skyscrapers that stand at least 150 m (492 feet) tall, based on standard height measurement. This includes spires and architectural details but does not include antenna masts.

Rank	Name	Image	Year	Height	Floors	Usage
1	Eton Place Dalian Tower 1		2016	383.2 m	80	Hotel / Office
2	Dalian International Trade Center		2019	370.2 m	86	Residential / Office
3	Eton Place Dalian Tower 2		2015	279.5 m	62	Residential/Office
4	Victoria Square 1		2018	268 m	68	Office
5	Victoria Square 2		2018	268 m	68	Office
6	Dalian Futures Square 2		2010	242.8 m	53	Office
7	Dalian Futures Square 1		2010	242.8 m	53	Office
8	Dalian World Trade Center		2000	242 m	50	Office
9	Huajun Financial Center		2022	231 m	51	Office
10	Dalian Dingsen Center North Tower		2016	228 m	52	Residential/Hotel
11	Dalian Dingsen Center South Tower		2016	228 m	52	Office
12	Wanda East Port Tower 1		2012	220 m	49	Hotel/Office
13	State Grid Tower		2021	220 m	42	Office/Hotel
14	World Finance Center		2001	219 m	50	Office
15	Furama Tower		2015	218 m	55	Residential
16	Jinzou Plaza		2000	216 m	49	Residential/Office
17	New Star Center Tower 1		2023	216 m	51	Office/Hotel
18	Dalian Tianan International Tower		2000	214 m	52	Office
19	Xinghai Long Island		2021	213 m	51	Office
20	East Harbour Place Tower 2		2018	210.5 m	62	Serviced Apartments/Hotel
21	China Co-op Group Tower		2016	209 m	41	Office
22	King of Towers		2016	208 m	41	Residential/Office
23	Orix Towers East		2023	207.2 m	42	Office
24	Orix Towers West		2023	207.2 m	42	Office
25	Victoria Mansion Tower 1		2017	206.4 m	60	Residential
26	Victoria Mansion Tower 2		2018	206.4 m	60	Residential
27	Jiahe Plaza		2013	205 m	54	Residential
28	Pinnacle		2012	203 m	56	Hotel/Office
29	Dalian Nova Star Sea Center Tower A		2016	202.4 m	49	Office
30	Yuanyang Building		2000	200.8 m	51	Hotel
31	Wanda East Port Tower 3		2012	197.8 m	57	Residential
32	Grand Hyatt Dalian		2014	195.4 m	47	Residential/Hotel
33	Wanda East Port Tower 4		2012	194.7 m	56	Residential
34	International Shipping Tower		2013	192 m	45	Office
35	Wanda East Port Tower 5		2012	191.5 m	55	Residential
36	New Star Center Tower 2		2022	186 m	38	Residential
37	New Star Center Tower 3		2022	186 m	38	Residential
38	New Star Center Tower 4		2022	186 m	38	Residential
39	New Star Center Tower 5		2022	186 m	38	Residential
40	Luxury Mountainview		2010	182 m	47	Residential
41	The Manhattan Office Tower		2002	180 m	48	Office
42	Coastal International Center Tower 1		2010	175 m	50	Residential
43	Coastal International Center Tower 2		2010	175 m	50	Residential
44	Coastal International Center Tower 3		2010	175 m	50	Residential
45	Wanda East Port Tower 2		2012	175 m	38	Hotel
46	Greenland Plaza Apartment Block 1		2014	172 m	50	Residential
47	Greenland Plaza Apartment Block 2		2014	172 m	50	Residential
48	Greenland Plaza Apartment Block 3		2014	172 m	50	Residential
49	Xiwang Tower		1999	170.6 m	40	Office
50	Peace City Modern D1		2005	169.8 m	55	Residential
51	Tianlun Commercial Building		1997	168 m	35	Office
52	Dalian Times Square 1		2008	163 m	47	Residential/Office
53	Dalian AVIC International Square Tower 2		2016	161 m	47	Residential
54	Dalian AVIC International Square Tower 3		2016	161 m	47	Residential
55	Dalian Freedom Plaza		2016	160 m	33	Office
56	Dalian AVIC International Square Tower 4		2016	157 m	46	Residential
57	Dalian AVIC International Square Tower 5		2016	157 m	46	Residential
58	Dalian Telecommunications Center		1996	154 m	32	Office

== Tallest under construction or proposed ==
=== Under construction ===
The following table lists buildings under construction in Dalian that are planned to rise at least 150 m (492 feet).

Name	Height m / feet	Floors*	Year*	Notes
International Shipping Center	248 / 813	54	TBD	
Coastal International Center Tower 5	211 / 692	53	2026 (On-hold)	
