= Grand Stage =

Grand Stage may refer to:

- Hongji Grand Stage, an opera house in Dalian, China
- Shanghai Grand Stage, an indoor stadium in Shanghai, China
