= Dalian Laodong Park =

Park in Dalian, China

Coordinates: 38.9143°N 121.6334°E

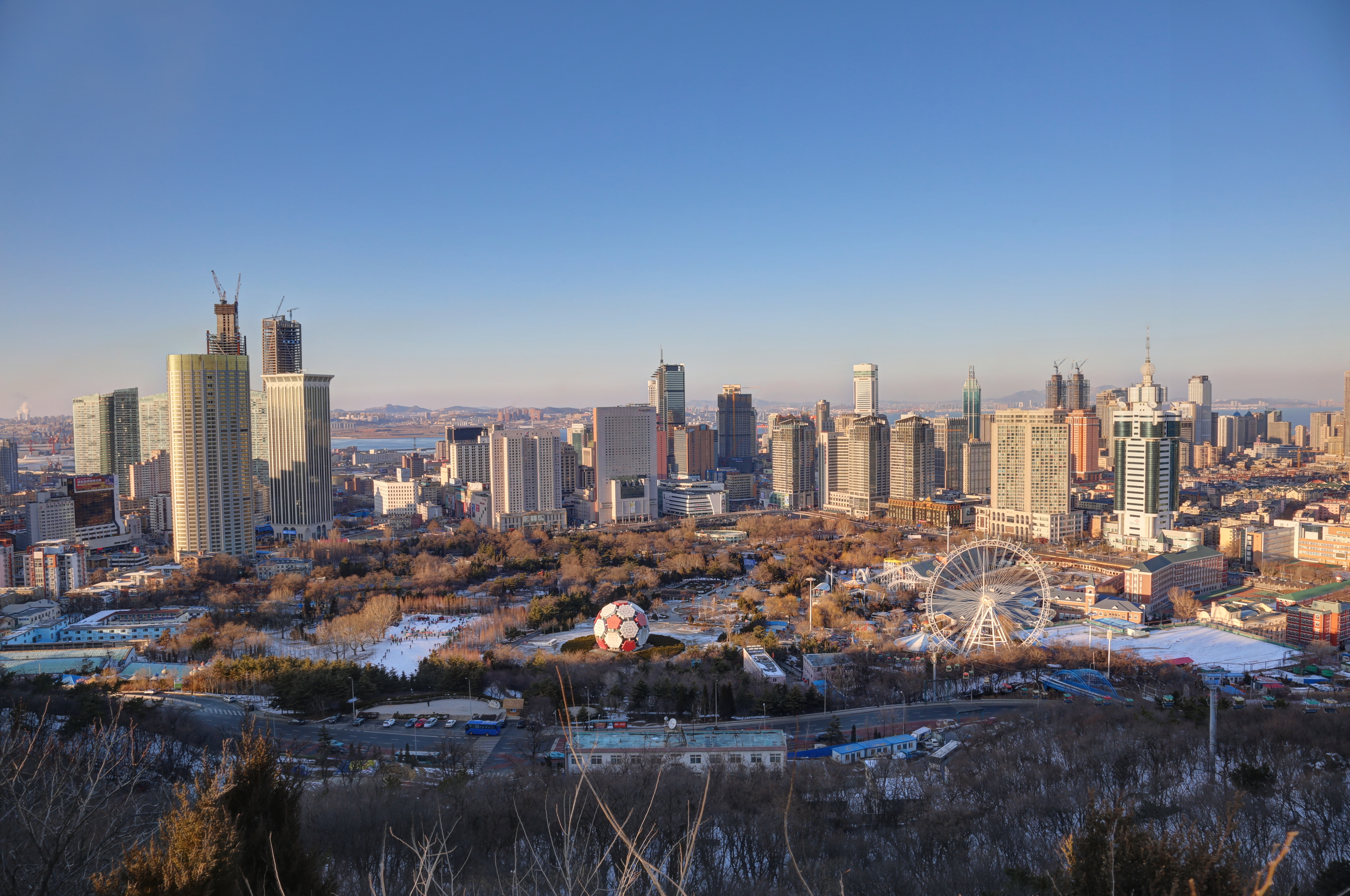
Dalian Labor Parkis near the Qingniwaqiao city center

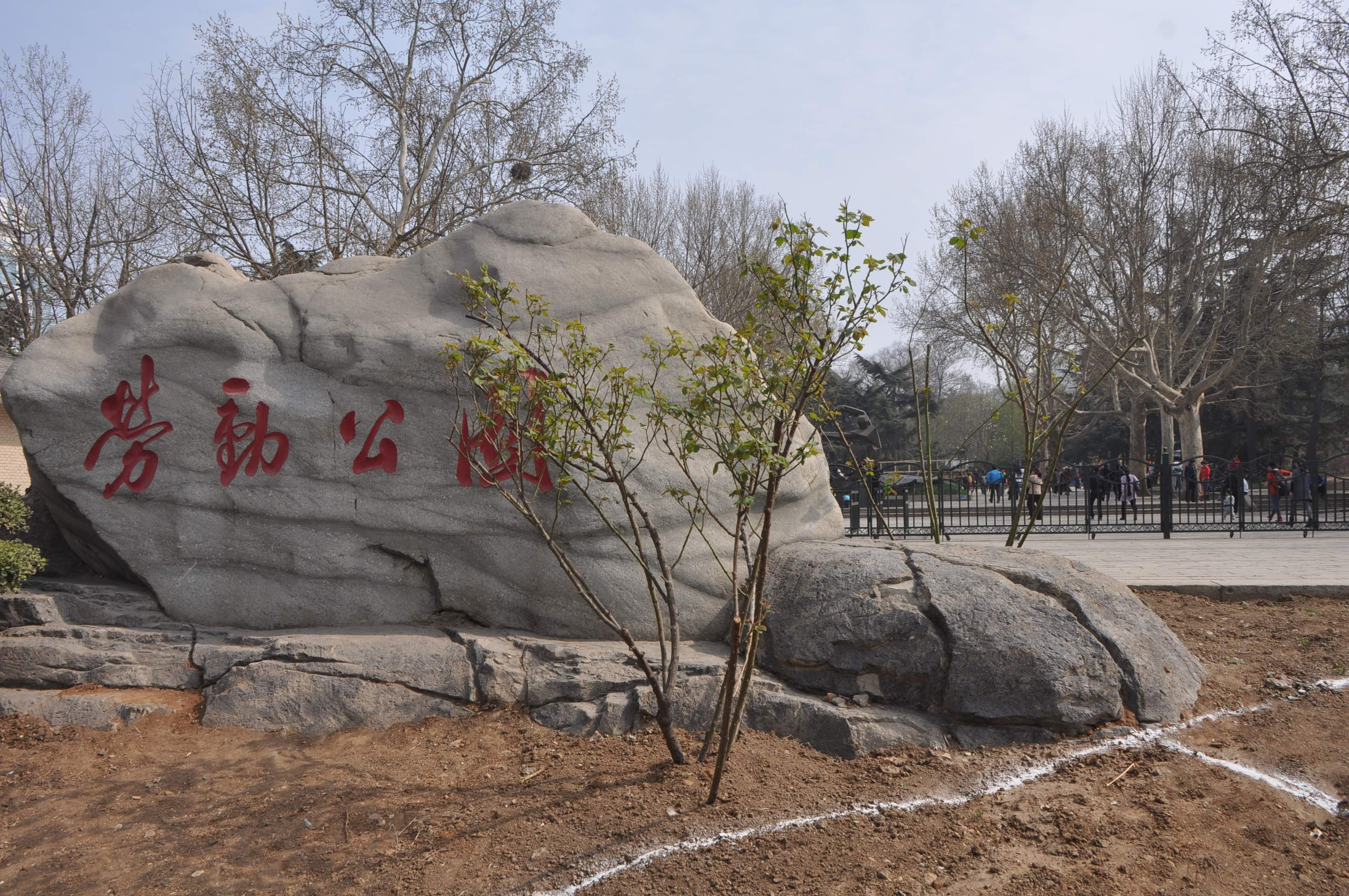
The name of the park "Laodong Gongyuan" at the entrance

Dalian Laodong Park (Chinese: 大连劳动公园) is the park in the center of Dalian, Liaoning Province, China. It is located south of the Qingniwaqiao CBD, at the northern foot of Green Mountain (绿山), and only 500 meters from Dalian railway station. With an area of 1.02 million square meters, it is the largest park in the city center and the earliest large-scale urban park. The annual tourist volume reaches more than 3 million people. It is such a popular place among the Dalianites that matchmakers post, on weekends, the paper slips on the branches of the trees in the eastern corner of the park, showing potential brides and bridegrooms.

== History ==
The original site of the park was in Wesy Qingniwa Village. The park was built in 1898 by Imperial Russia, which occupied Lüda. It was located in the west of Dalian (then named Dalini City) at that time, so it was named West Park.

Japan defeated Russia in the Russo-Japanese War, and after occupying Lüda, the park was expanded, and has a sumo wrestling field, a golf course, horse riding clubs, swimming pools, etc. At that time, there was a tiger in the park, so it was renamed Tiger Park. In 1925, a tower for soldiers who died in battle was built in the south of the park, and the ashes of the Japanese war dead were moved from Asahi Square (also known as Laozhongbei Square, now Sanba Square). With the expansion of the urban area, the park was gradually moved to its current site in the city center, so it was renamed Central Park (中央公園) in 1926.

After Japan was defeated in World War II and withdrew from China, on November 1, 1947, the park was renamed Lenin Park in accordance with the decision of the CPC Central Committee. On the eve of the founding of the People's Republic of China, the local government mobilized the mass to do voluntary labor to renovate the park, and erected a monument beside the lotus pond in the park, with the words "Labor Creates the World" (劳动创造世界) written on the monument, so the park was changed to the current name of Laodong Park (Laodong means "labor") on March 3, 1949. The Zhongling Tower in the park was renamed the Wuyi Tower, meaning the "May Day Tower".

Later, the Wuyi Tower was demolished, some saying in 1975 and others in the 1960s.

== Recent Status ==
In the eastern part of the park is the lotus pond. The bridge there is the historical Qingniwa Bridge. Red-crowned cranes, peacocks, sika deer and other animals are kept in the cages in the western part of the park. The terrain in the south is relatively high, and there is a viewing platform, overlooking Dalian's CBD. There is also a new playground, which has the first double-track dry land sled in China, and a rafting facility for amusement, the largest investment project of the park.

=== Blessing bell ===
The blessing bell (祈福钟) was originally cast in Korea in 1347 AD, during Emperor Emperor's reign of the Yuan Dynasty. In 1905, Abe Eizen (阿部荣全), the master of the Japanese Buddhism Togan Sect, came to Dalian to preach and to prepare for the construction of Higashi Honganji Temple branch. After learning about the bell in Incheon, Korea, he reported it to the Japanese authorities in the following year, so they moved it to Higashi Honganji Temple branch in Dalian. In 1958, it was moved to Laodong Park. Inscribed on the bell is the Sanskrit text from the "Aroni Mantra" scripture, hence the name.

=== Centennial warehouse ===
Located in the north of the park, it was sealed up on September 19, 1999, on the centennial day of Dalian’s founding. The warehouse stores the 100 most meaningful objects in the past century since Dalian’s founding. In addition, Jiang Zemin, then General Secretary of the CPC Central Committee and President of the State, wrote the title and the letter written him to the then mayor Bo Xilai in 2099 is inscribed. There is a stone tablet oi the warehouse, and a forest of pink cherry trees and deep blue peaches are planted. It was to be unsealed on the 200th anniversary of the founding of Dalian.

For some reason, the centennial warehouse was gradually removed from 2016 to 2017. The original site is now covered by colored bricks, and the whereabouts of the items in the warehouse are unknown.

=== Big soccer ball ===
Located in the south of the park is a big soccer ball, colored in red and white. It is regarded as a symbol of Dalian with a professional soccer team, with a diameter of 19.6 meters and a height of 21 meters, covering an area of 2,631 square meters. Inside the big ball was actually the Dalian Museum of Architectural Art, which was later changed to a revolving restaurant with music.

=== Skiing slope ===
Located on the west side of the Big Football is the only ski resort in the urban area. With an area of nearly 30,000 square meters, it is divided into a standard primary skiing slope with a length of more than 200 meters and a width of more than 80 meters, a surface lift, and a practice slope of more than 1,000 square meters. It is supported by artificial snow and is only open in winter.

== Annual Events ==
The large-scale city-wide events, such as the Dalian Acacia Appreciation Fair, Tulip Exhibition, Chrysanthemum Exhibition, Fireworks and Firecrackers Festival, and New Year & Lantern Exhibition, are held in the park.

== Gallery ==
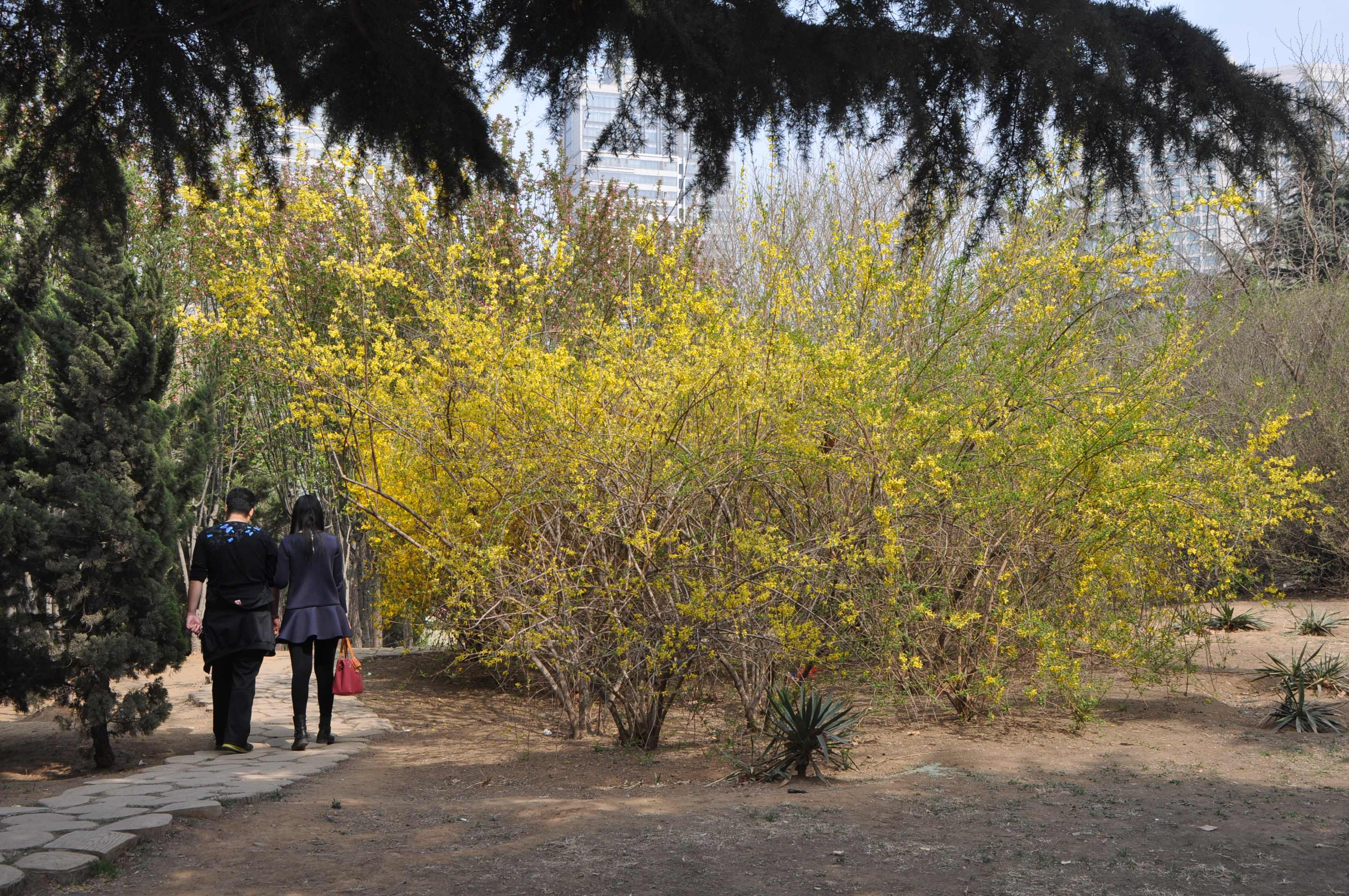
The winter jasmine comes into bloom as the first sign of spring

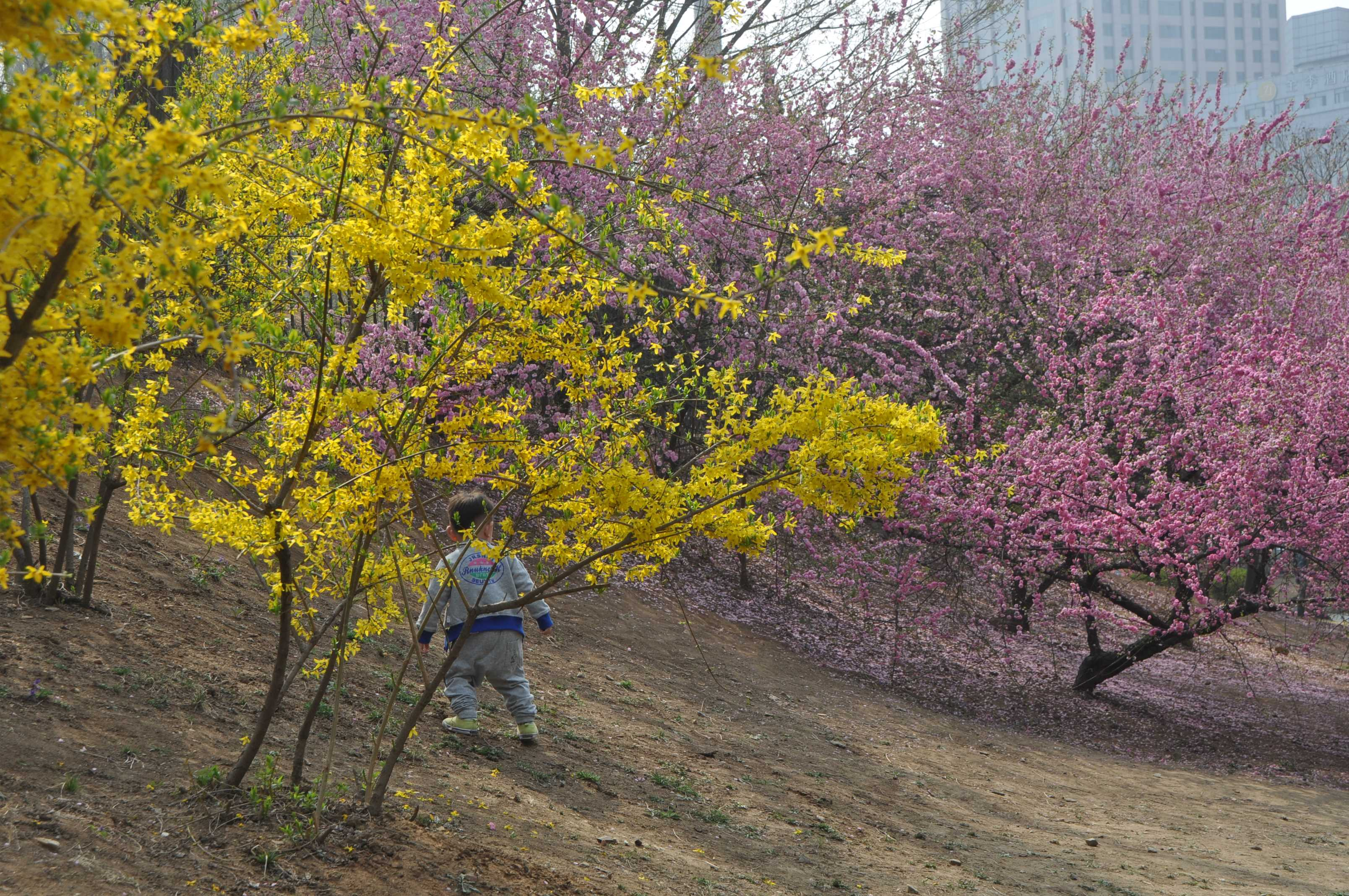
The winter jasmine flowers slowly giving way to cherry blossoms

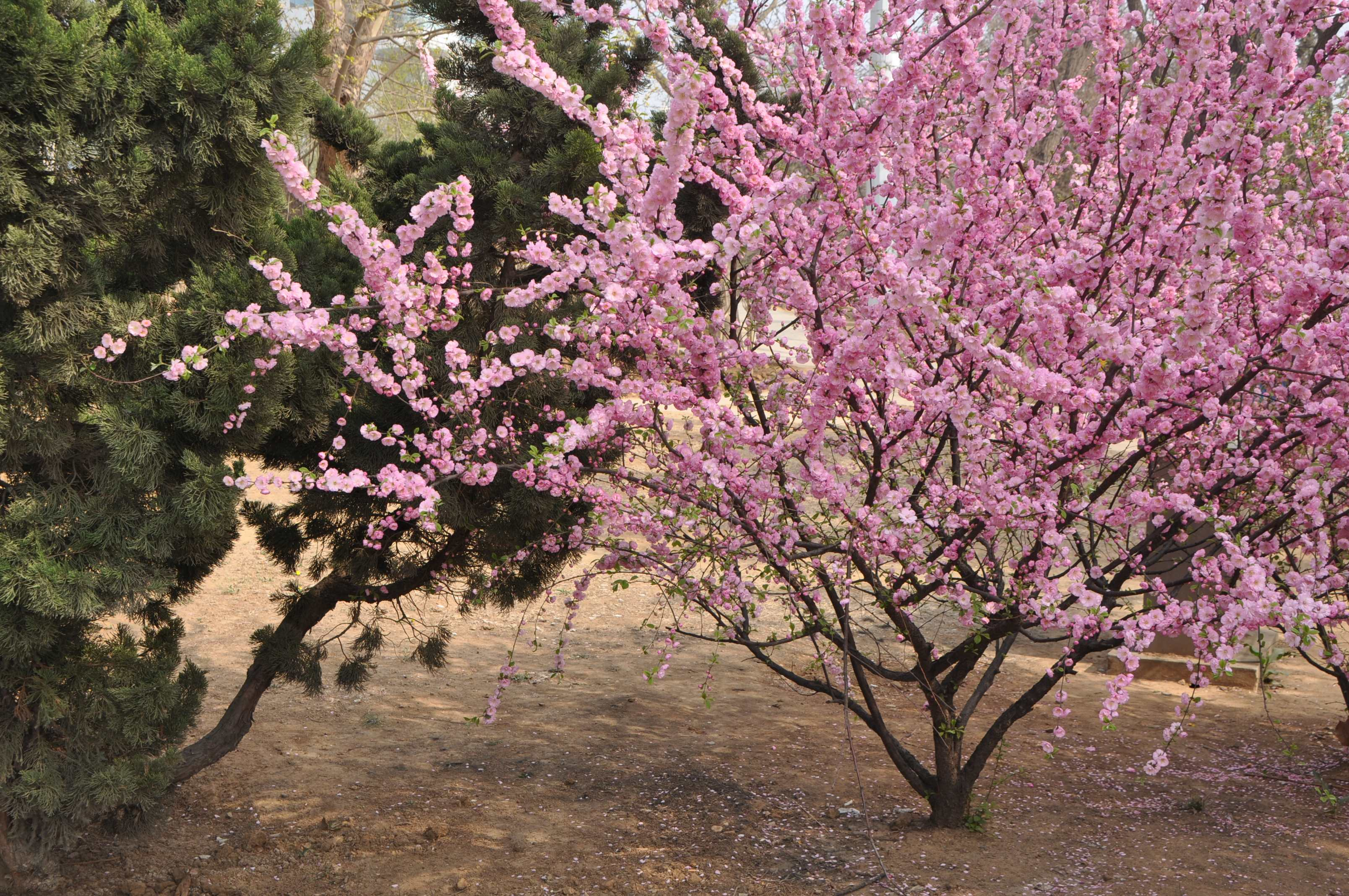
And then the cherry trees come into full bloom.

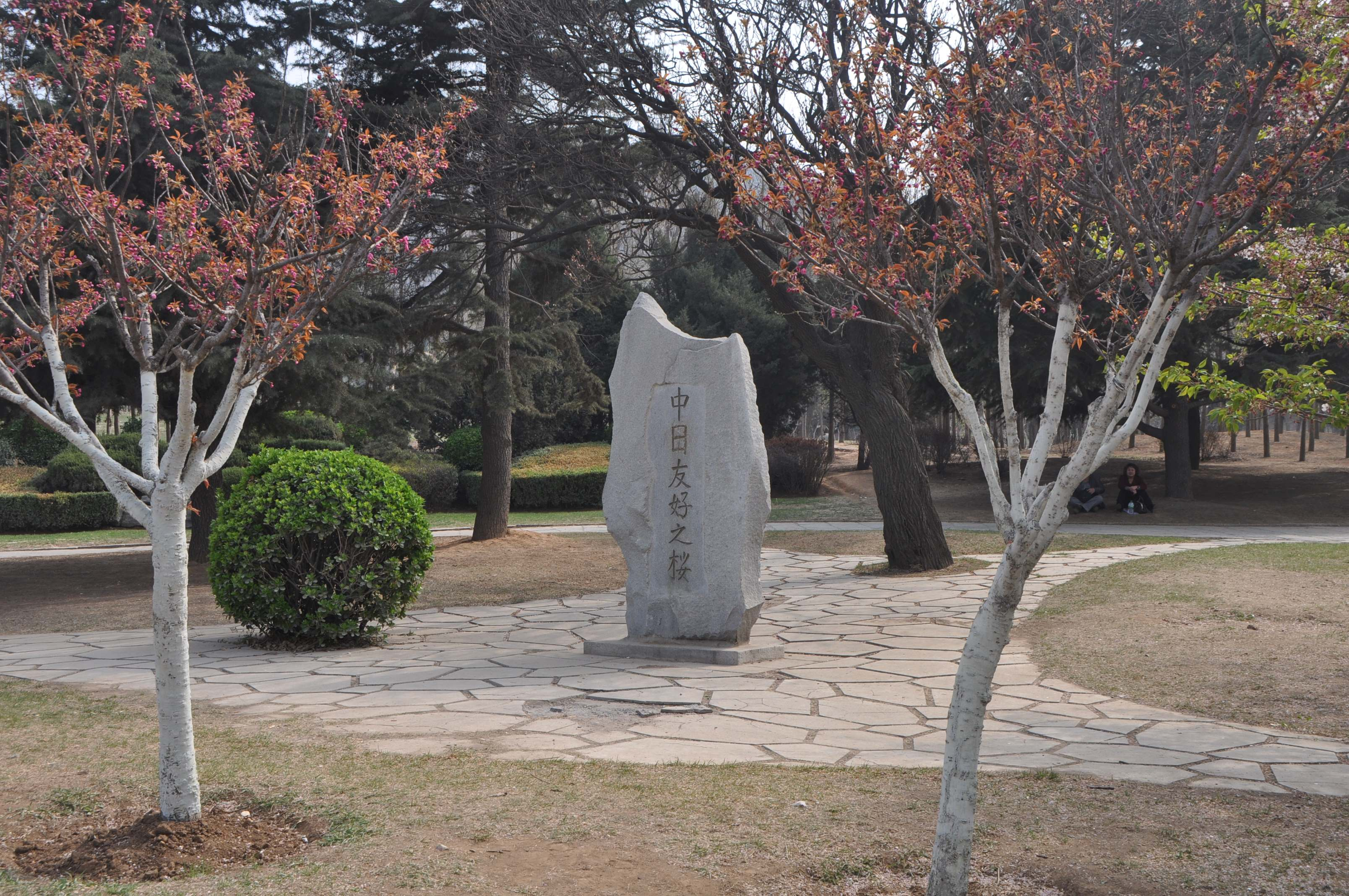
Dalian Laodong Park, stele of Sino-Japanese Friendship Cherry Trees

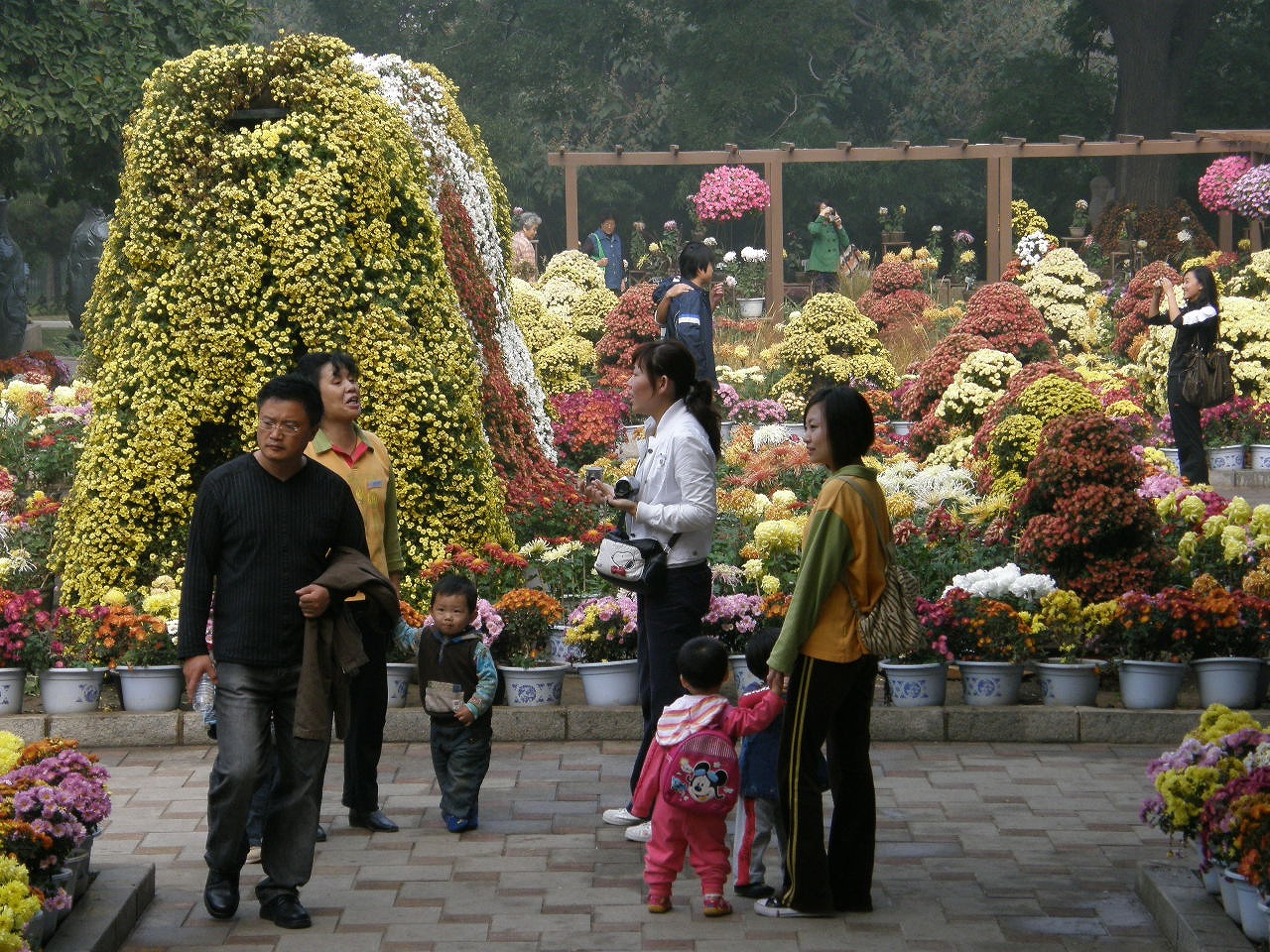
In fall, the chrysanthemum display

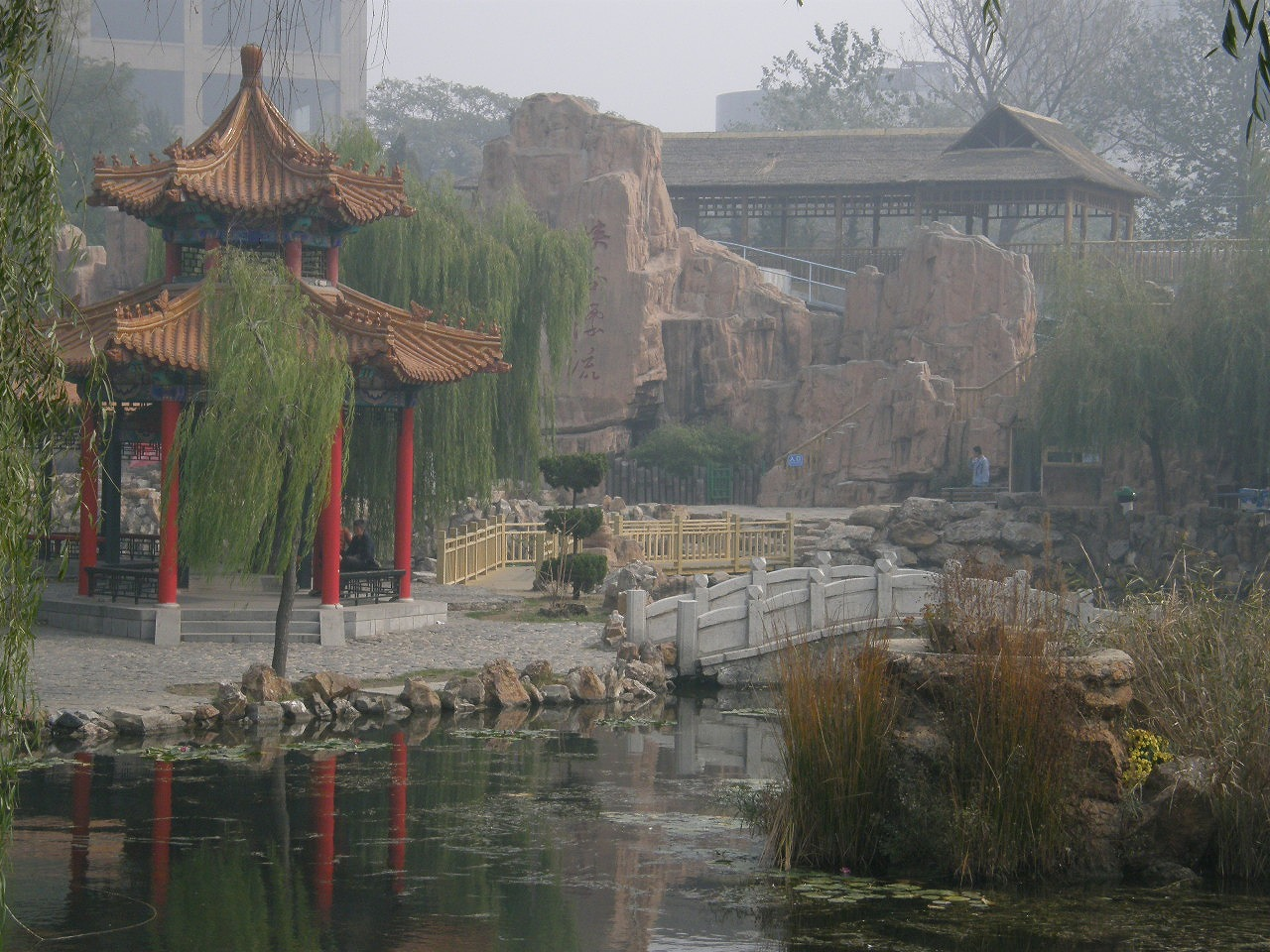
The park is both traditional and modern.

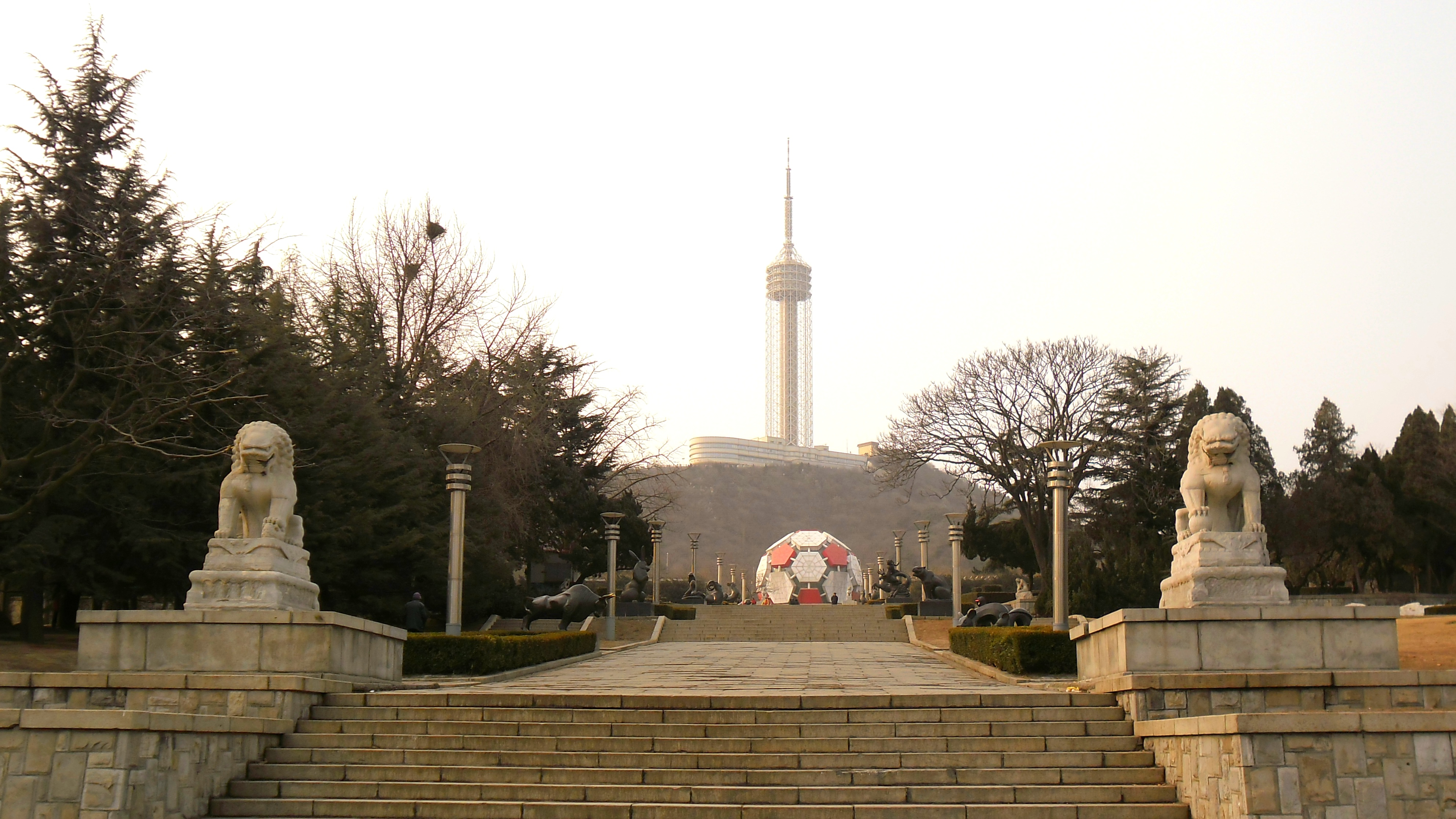
The big plastic soccer ball with the TV tower on Green Mountain in the background.

== See also ==
- List of Dalian landmarks
- Xinghai Park
- Zhongshan Park
