= Olympia 66 =

Olympia 66 恒隆广场
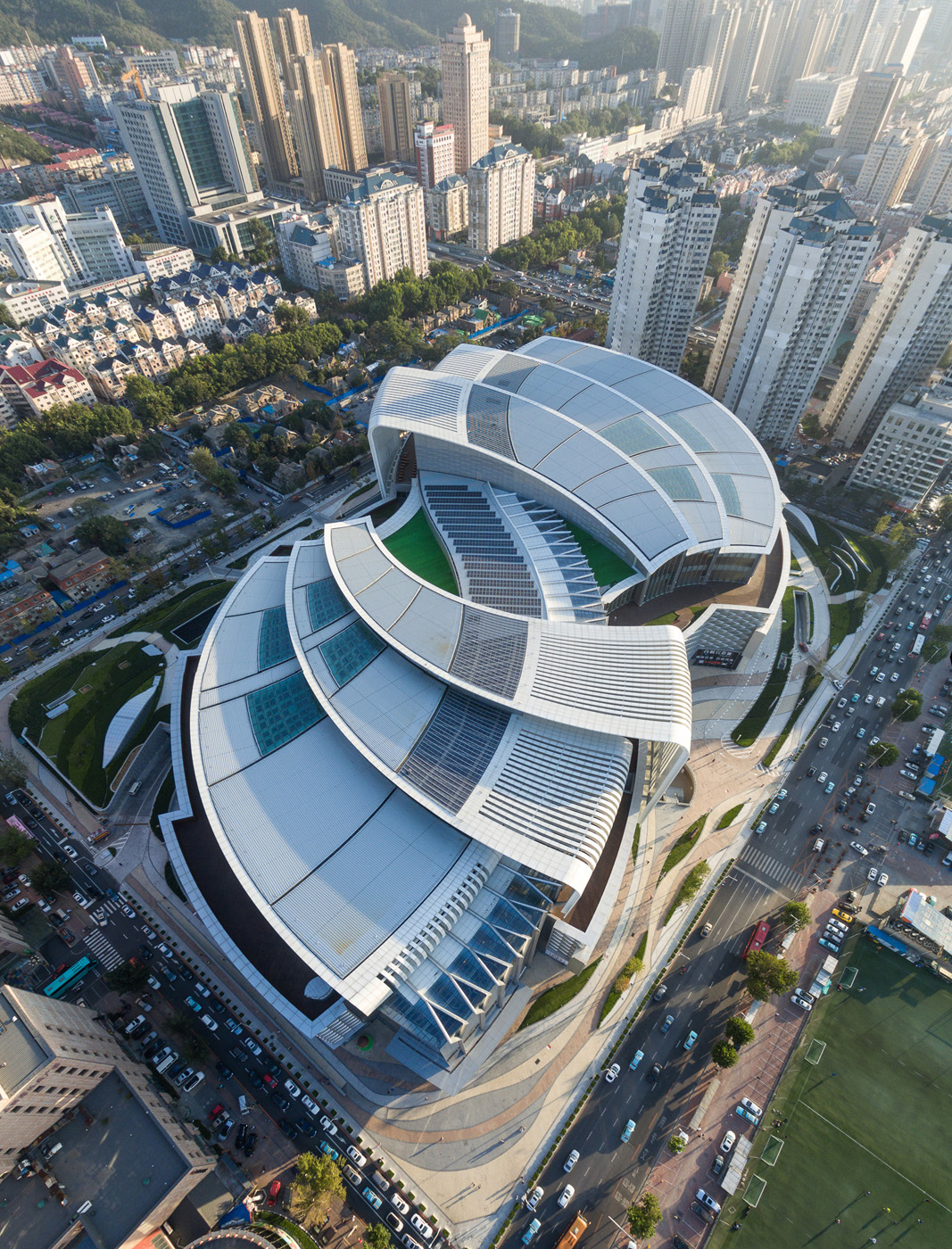
- Olympia 66 in Dalian

- Location within China

General information
- Type: Retail
- Location: Dalian, Liaoning, China
- Coordinates: 38.9061°N 121.6072°E
- Completed: 2015

Technical details
- Floor area: 221,900 square meters

Design and construction
- Architect: Aedas
- Developer: Hang Lung Properties

Website
- www.olympia66.com

Olympia 66 (Chinese: 恒隆广场; pinyin: Hénglóng Guǎngchǎng) is a major shopping complex in Xigang District of Dalian, Liaoning, China, designed by Aedas, which began construction in 2011. It is located on Wusi Road, one of the main commercial avenues in Dalian. Completed in 2015, Olympia 66 has 221,900 square meters of shopping, dining and entertainment space.

This shopping complex is on the site of the former Dalian People's Stadium. To the east is the headquarters of the municipal government, located in the People's Square, and the Xinghai Square is to the west.

The design of Olympia 66 was inspired by the Chinese twin carp emblem, a symbol of wealth and abundance in Chinese culture which are typically used in Chinese New Year paintings.
