= Dalian Institute of Science and Technology =

Engineering college in Dalian, China

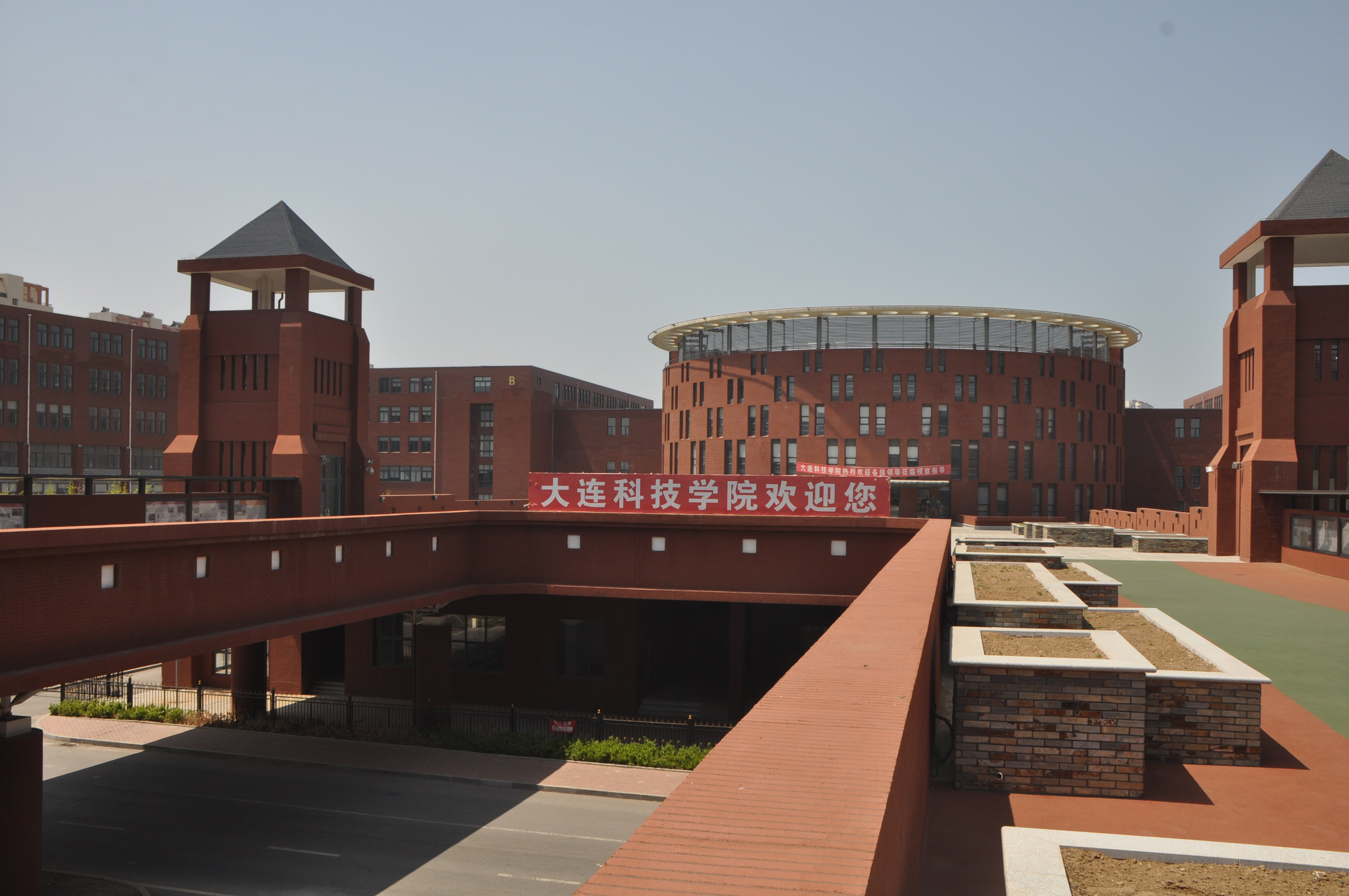
Dalian Institute of Science and Technology, Dalian, China

Dalian Institute of Science and Technology (Chinese: 大连科技学院), is a four-year engineering college, located in Lüshunkou District, Dalian City, Liaoning Province, China.

== General ==
It has its origin in the Information Technology Department, established in 2002, of Dalian Jiaotong University, and became in 2003 an independent school owned by both Jiaotong University and Dalian Sunshine Century Group. It was renamed in 2011 as Dalian Institute of Science and Technology.

== Departments ==
It has now various departments, such as mechanical engineering, electrical engineering, information technology, software technology, foreign languages (English and Japanese) and fine arts. The International Cooperation and Exchange College has close tie with Wright State University, Ohio, U.S., and other colleges overseas.

== See also ==
- Dalian Jiaotong University
