= Dalian People's Stadium =

Former sports venue in Dalian, China

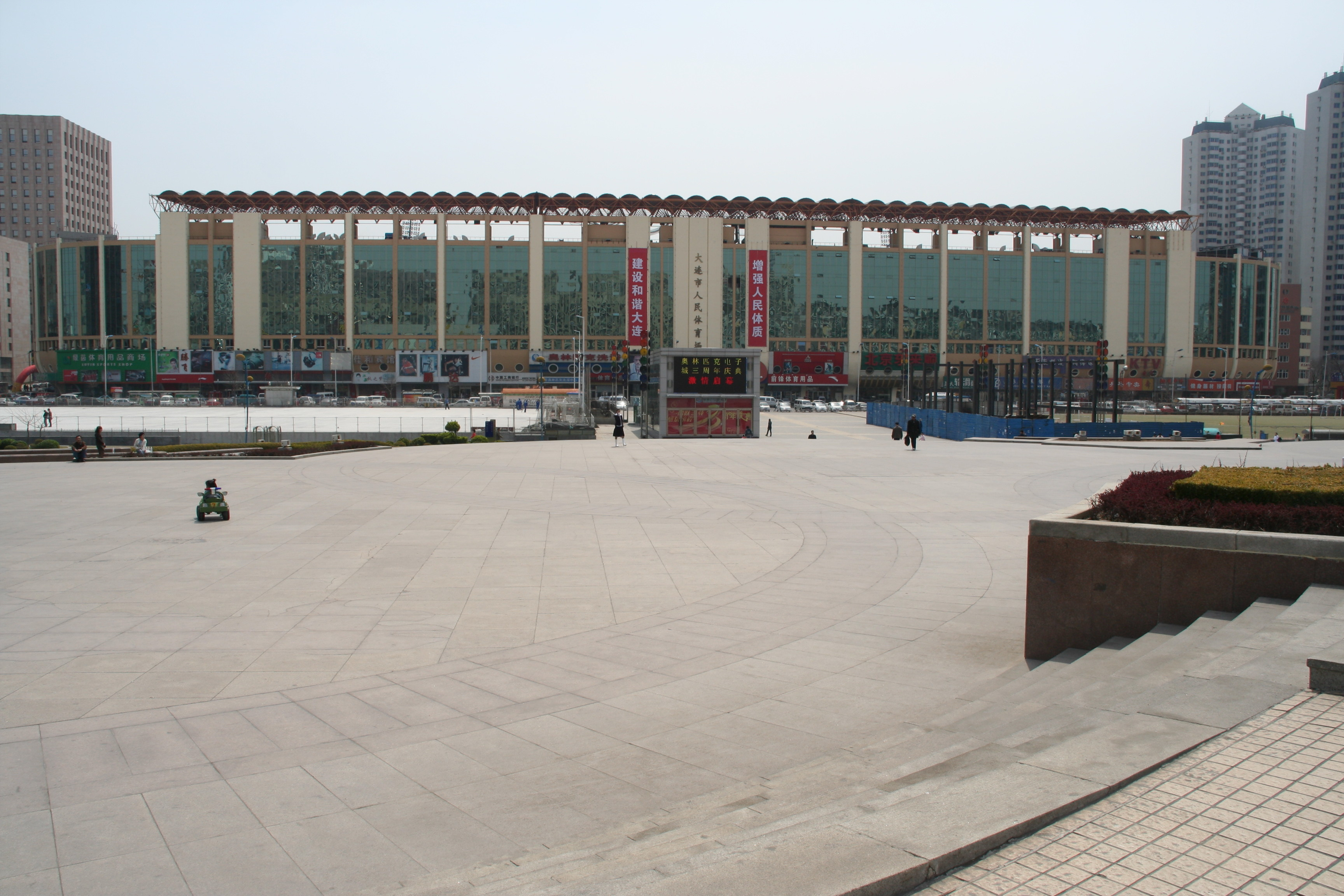
Dalian People's Stadium from the Olympic Square, 2007

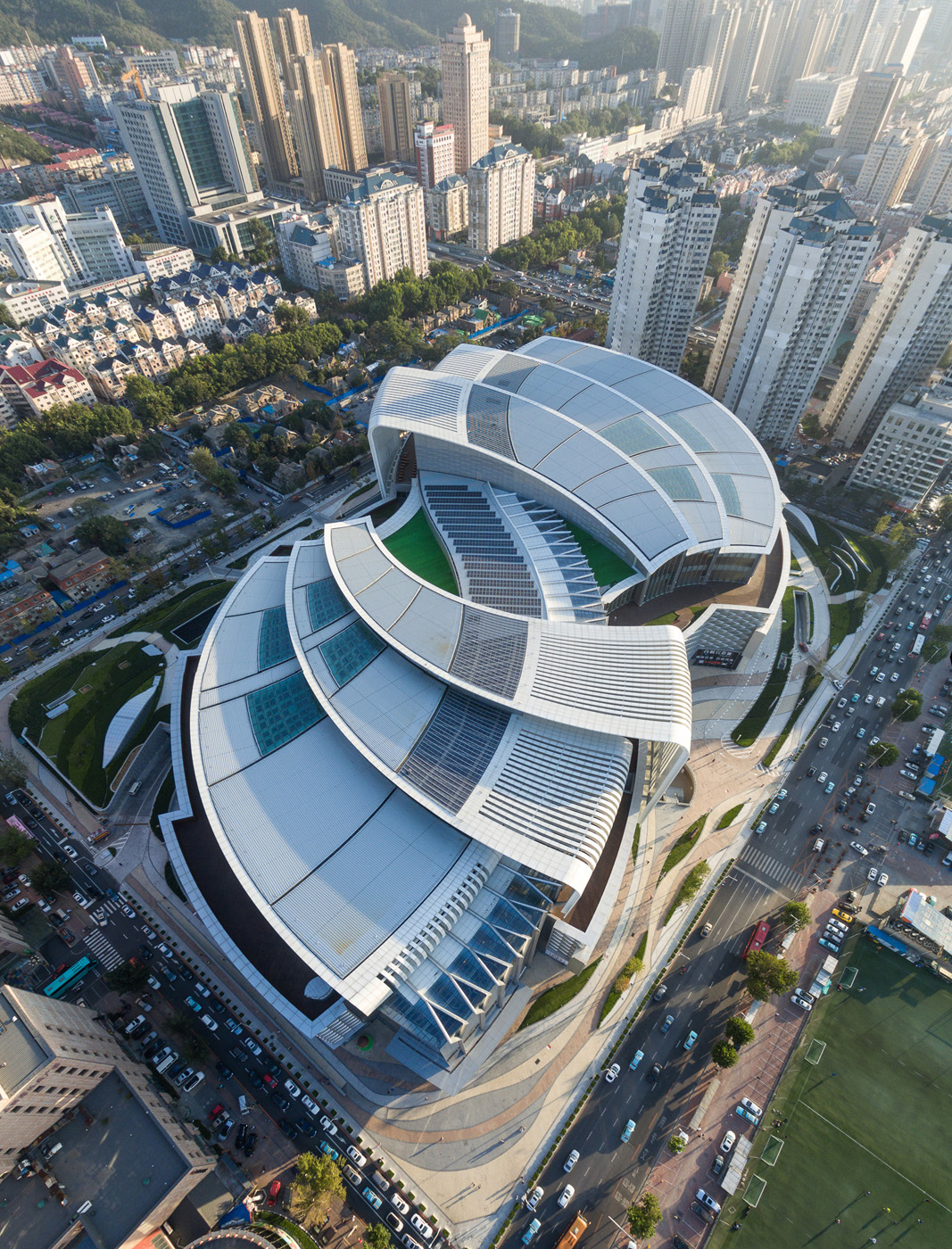
The site of the stadium currently houses a major shopping mall, the Olympia 66.

Dalian People's Stadium (Chinese: 大连市人民体育场) was a multi-purpose stadium located in the Olympic Square in Dalian, Liaoning, China. The stadium was built in 1976 and had a capacity of 55,843. It was the home stadium of former local football team Dalian Shide. The stadium has been demolished and the site is now used for a major shopping mall, the Olympia 66 (Chinese: 恒隆广场).
