= Dalian Greenland Center =

Skyscraper in Dalian, China

Coordinates: 38.9266°N 121.6669°E

- 大连绿地中心
- Interactive map of the Dalian Greenland Center area

General information
- Status: On hold
- Type: Office
- Location: Dalian, Liaoning, China
- Groundbreaking: 28 September 2010
- Construction started: 22 October 2014
- Estimated completion: 2029

Height
- Antenna spire: 518 m (1,699 ft)

Technical details
- Floor count: 88

Design and construction
- Architect: HOK
- Developer: Greenland Group

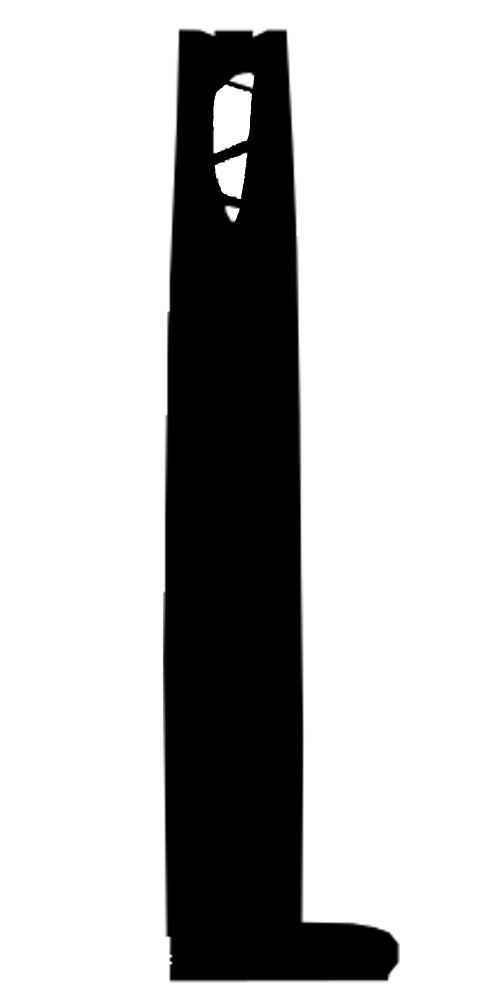
Dalian Greenland Center

Dalian Greenland Center is a skyscraper on hold in Dalian, Liaoning, China. It is expected to have 88 floors and be 518 metres (1,699 ft) tall. The anticipated completion date is currently unknown. When completed, Dalian Greenland Center will become the tallest building in Dalian.

== See also ==
- List of tallest buildings in China
- List of tallest buildings in Dalian
