= Eton Place Dalian =

Skyscraper complex in Dalian, China

Coordinates: 38°55′03″N 121°37′28″E

- 大连裕景中心
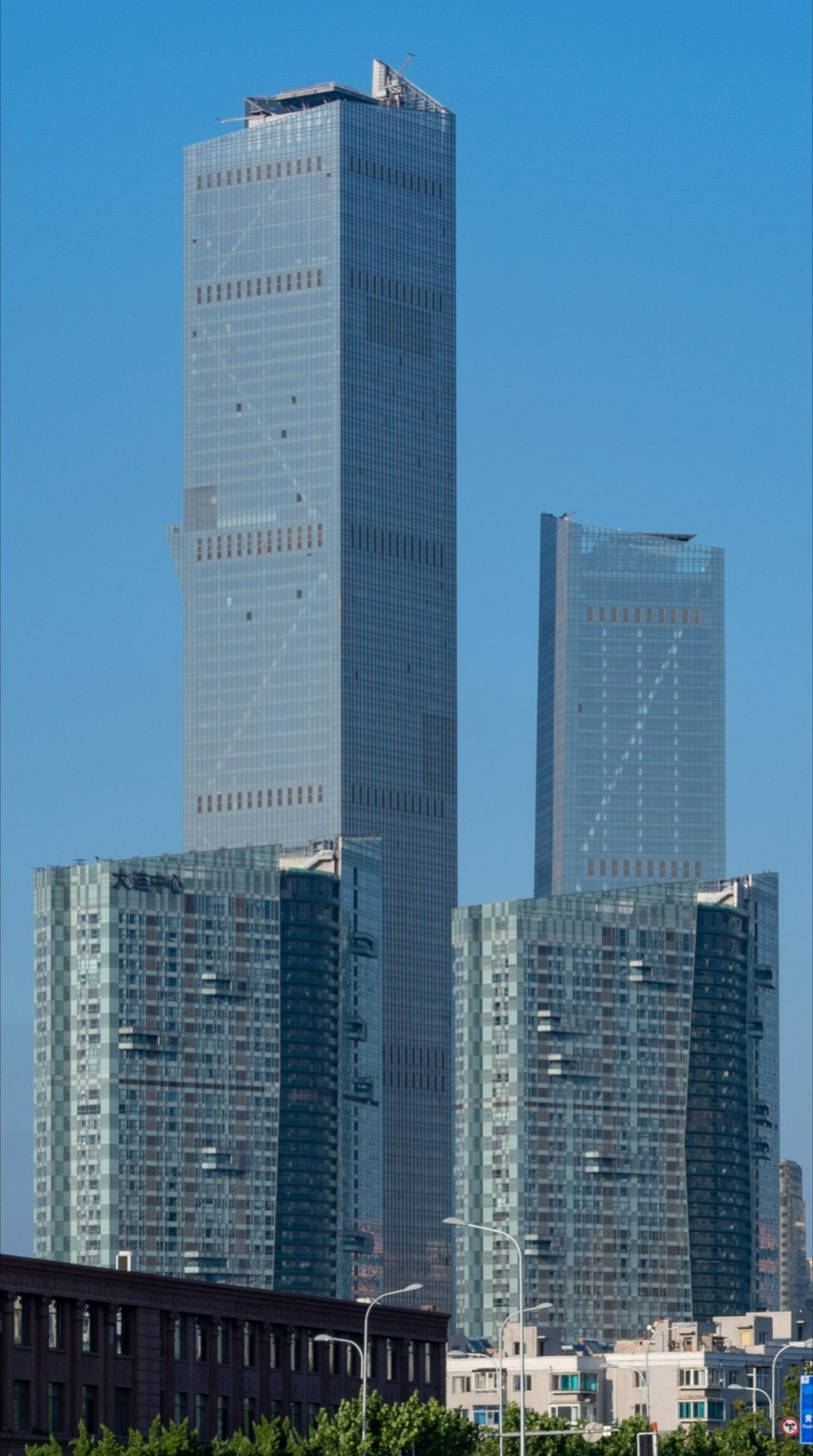
- Eton Place Dalian, August 2018
- Interactive map of the Eton Place Dalian area

General information
- Status: Completed
- Type: Office
- Location: Dalian, China
- Construction started: September 19, 2008
- Completed: October 9, 2015

Height
- Antenna spire: 388 m (1,273 ft)
- Top floor: 349.5 m (1,147 ft)

Technical details
- Floor count: 81
- Floor area: 145,400 m^{2} (1,565,000 sq ft)
- Lifts/elevators: 30

Design and construction
- Architect: NBBJ
- Engineer: Arup

Eton Place Dalian is a 4-building skyscraper complex in Dalian, China. The tallest tower is 388 m high and has 81 floors. It was completed in 2016.

== See also ==
- List of tallest buildings in the world
- List of tallest buildings in China
- List of tallest buildings in Dalian
