= Dalian Yuming Senior High School =

- 大连育明高级中学

Location
- 70 Yangshu Street, Hi-Tech Zone; Dalian, Liaoning 116023

Information
- Motto: 民族 理想 荣誉 (Nation, Ideal, Honour)
- Established: 1998
- Founder: Bo Xilai
- School district: Dalian, Liaoning, China
- Principal: Zhang Youlin (张有林)
- Staff: 173
- Enrollment: ~1500
- Language: Chinese (Mandarin)
- Area: 48,000 square metres (12 acres)
- Affiliation: Public
- Website: Yuming's Home Page

Dalian Yuming Senior High School (Chinese:大连育明高级中学) is a public high school in Dalian, Liaoning, China. It is known for its specialty on Chinese Science Olympiad, and is highly considered among all senior high schools in China. The school is also known for its annual bonfire night.

== History ==
Dalian Yuming High School was established in 1998 by former mayor Bo Xilai.

== Academics ==
Upon establishment, the school continuously developed its specialty in Chinese Science Olympiad, and gained a reputation for winning many prizes and medals in it, which turned out to advance the reputation and success rate when their students apply for autonomous enrollments of famous Chinese colleges, especially those in project 985 and project 211. Some prize winning students were selected to compete in International Science Olympiads.

Yuming is regarded as one of the best high schools in Dalian because of its education quality and overall college enrolment rate, being frequently compared with No. 24 High School.

== Bonfire night ==
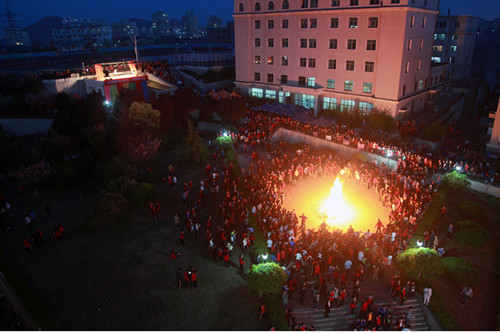
Bonfire in Yuming

Every year at the end of April, Yuming hosts a bonfire night to commemorate the upcoming Youth Day, and to enjoy the Labour Day vacation in advance. The event usually starts after midday, and ends after dark. It features barbecues, student performance (usually singing and dancing), and ignition of the bonfire by the principal towards the end of the event.
