= Dalian Maple Leaf International School Senior High =

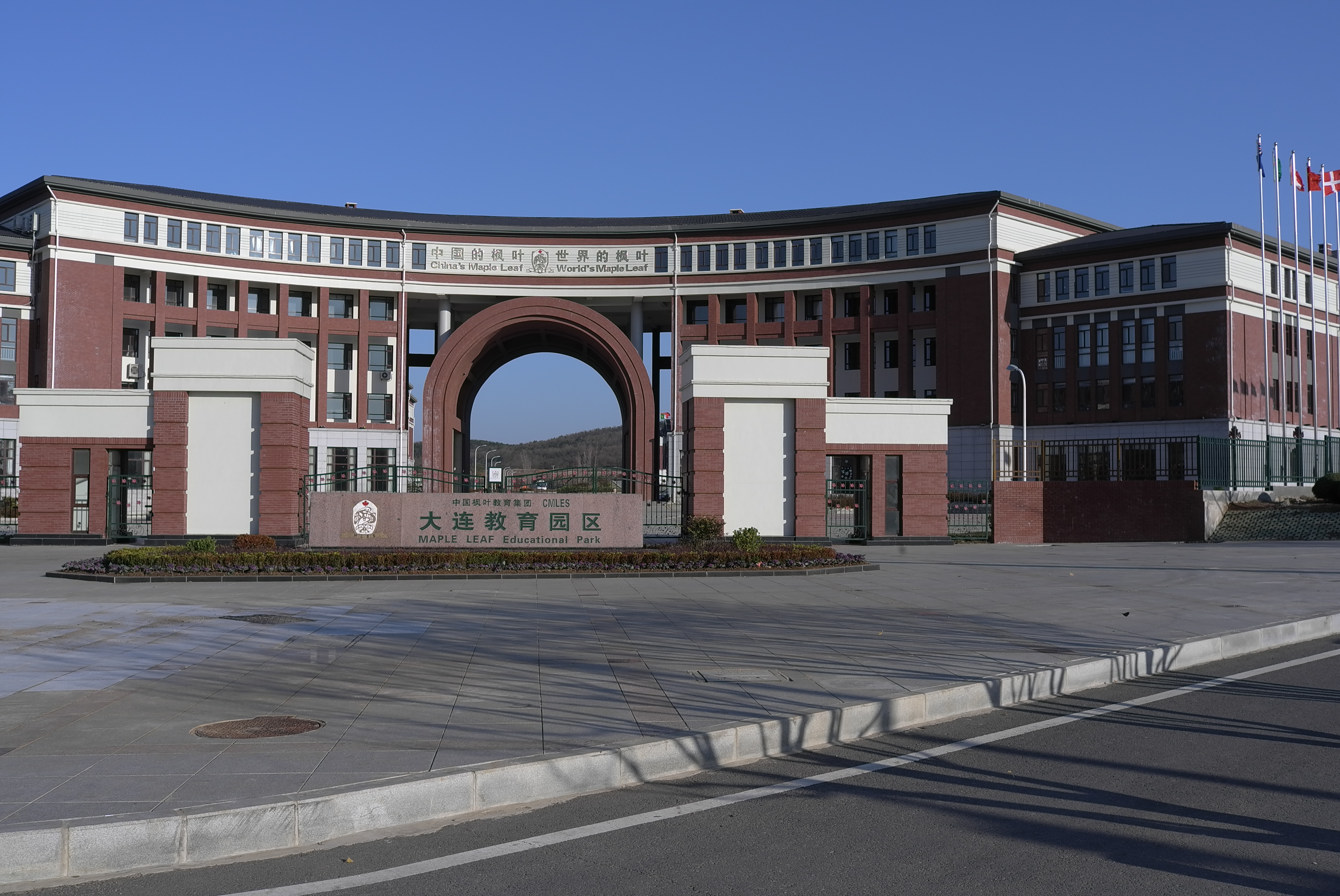
Headquarters of Maple Leaf Educational Systems in Jinshitan, Dalian, Liaoning, China

Dalian Maple Leaf International School Senior High is a part of the Maple Leaf Educational Systems (MLES) located in Jinshitan National Resort in Jinzhou District, Dalian, China, providing the British Columbia (BC) high school program from grade ten to grade twelve.

Maple Leaf accepts both domestic students and international students. Students are registered as British Columbia students, write the same Grade 10, 11 and 12 BC examinations as resident students in BC, and graduate with the same BC Ministry of Education transcripts and graduation (Dogwood) diploma as resident students in BC. The grade 10-12 courses, with the exception of Mandarin and Chinese social studies, are taught by B.C. certified teachers. Currently, 2014, over 2,800 students are enrolled in grades 10-12 at the Dalian campus.

Maple Leaf offers separate-gender campuses at the Dalian location and mixed-gender campuses in Tianjin, Wuhan, Chongqing, Zhenjiang, Luoyang, Ordos, and Shanghai.

== History ==
=== School History ===
Dalian Maple Leaf International School: Jinshitan High School was opened in 1995 with 14 students. Student enrollment rapidly increased and new school facilities were constructed to meet the growing demand.

In 2009, a new girls’ campus was opened in Jinshitan across the road from the existing high school, which is now the boys’ campus. The combined enrollment in Grades 10, 11 and 12 from both campuses exceeds 2,600.

Maple Leaf's Jinshitan High School's program was first inspected and certified by the British Columbia Ministry of Education in the 1997–98 school year. It was the first offshore school educational program certified by the Province of British Columbia and the school served as the Province's pilot school for developing British Columbia's Offshore School Certification Program.

Today, approximately 125 B.C. certified teachers are teaching British Columbia's high school program in Grades 10 to 12 at the Jinshitan campuses.

=== History of Maple Leaf Educational System ===
==== 1995 ====
- Sherman Jen, founder and Headmaster, opened Dalian Maple Leaf International School Senior High, with 14 high school students enrolled

==== 1998 ====
- Dalian Maple Leaf International School Senior High was inspected and certified as British Columbia's first Offshore School Program

==== 1999 ====
- The first graduating class from Dalian Maple Leaf International School Senior High received their high school diplomas and headed off for colleges and universities in Canada, USA, UK and Korea

==== 2001 ====
- The first Maple Leaf Elementary School opens in the Dalian Development Zone, Kaifaqu

==== 2003 ====
- MLES Main Office opens in downtown Dalian
- The first middle school campus of Maple Leaf Middle School, Daheishi (Black Mountain) Campus

==== 2004 ====
- Maple Leaf Institute of Technology opens in downtown Dalian (in cooperation with BCIT)
- First Maple Leaf Pre-School opens (in cooperation with Learning Vision: Singapore)

==== 2005 ====
- MLES Celebrated the 10th anniversary of the establishment of Dalian Maple Leaf International School Senior High

==== 2006 ====
- Newly renovated campus for the Maple Leaf Foreign Nationals School opens in Dalian
- Expansion throughout Dalian of Maple Leaf Pre-Schools

==== 2007 ====
- Maple Leaf English is established to provide high quality ESL instruction and materials through the MLES system of schools
- Two new campuses are open in Wuhan: Wuhan Maple Leaf Foreign Nationals School and Wuhan Maple Leaf International High School

==== 2008 ====
- The third MLES BC high school program opens in Tianjin, the Tianjin (TEDA) Maple Leaf International School
- Maple Leaf Elementary and Middle Schools open in Tianjin, offering an enhanced Chinese program K–9

==== 2009 ====
- The fourth BC High School program opens in Chongqing, Maple Leaf International School Chongqing Campus
- A second campus is opened in Dalian allowing the creation of separate boys’ and girls’ campuses (Maple Leaf International School High School Campus in Jinshitan Holiday Resort with Boys’ and Girls’ Campuses)

==== 2010 ====
- MLES Celebrates its 15-year Anniversary
- Daheishi Middle School moves to new facilities at the Dalian campus in Jinshitan
- MLES Headquarter relocation to Jinshitan leading to the establishment of the Maple Leaf Educational Park - Dalian
- The Foreign Nationals School Dalian moves to a new location in downtown Dalian

==== 2011 ====
- The fifth BC High School program opens in leased facilities in Zhenjiang – Maple Leaf International High School – Zhenjiang. Construction begins on new campus to be opened in 2012
- New Elementary and Middle School facilities open in Tianjin TEDA leading to the establishment of the Maple Leaf Educational Park – Tianjin TEDA
- Groundbreaking ceremony for the MLES first school in Korea – Maple Leaf International Academy – takes place in Suncheon City

==== 2012 ====
- MLES signs agreement with the Educational Authority in Inner Mongolia, Ordos to establish a new school, Maple Leaf International Elementary/Middle School, which was scheduled to open in September 2012
- MLES signs a partnership agreement with the Henan Provincial Government to operate a Maple Leaf International Elementary/Middle School in a newly constructed, government owned facility in Luoyang (Classes will began in September 2012)

==== 2013 ====
On September 2, Mr. Sherman Jen, Founder and CEO of MLES and distinguished guests, parents and students celebrated the opening of the newest Maple Leaf international school in China. The Maple Leaf International School - Shanghai is the 7th Maple Leaf high school, approved to deliver the BC curriculum. This school expands the Maple Leaf Educational Systems presence throughout China, adding Shanghai to the locations of our existing schools in Dalian, Wuhan, Tianjin, Chongqing, Zhenjiang, Luoyang and Ordos.

==== 2016 ====
- August 29, Dalian Maple Leaf opened a new school in KaiFaQu, Dalian. The school is bigger and includes more facilities than the old school in Xigang District.

== Academics ==
Dalian Maple Leaf International School Senior High (grades 10–12) offers B.C. certified courses British Columbia, Canada programs, taught entirely in English by B.C. certified teachers. Students must complete the same courses, meet the same learning outcomes, are assessed in the same manner by the same standards as all British Columbia students. High school students write the same provincial examinations and graduate with the same British Columbia high school "Dogwood" diploma as students residing in British Columbia, Canada.

In addition, Chinese students complete extra Chinese courses, such as Chinese History, Geography, Political Science music and Mandarin, and graduate with a Chinese high school diploma as well. These Maple Leaf programs meet all British Columbia curriculum and Offshore School Program standards, as well as the inspection requirements of China's Education Authorities. Chinese as a Second Language (CSL) is provided for foreign students.

In order to graduate with a British Columbia Dogwood Certificate, students must accumulate at least 80 credits for courses completed in grades 10, 11, and 12. Credits from required courses contribute 48 credits, at least 28 credits must come from elective courses (students choose their electives according to their educational pathway), and Graduation Transitions has 4 credits.

== Student life ==
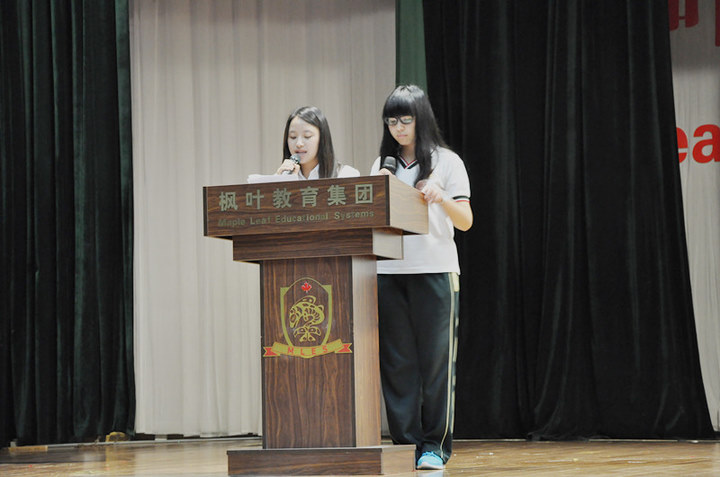
Club Oscar Donating Ceremony 2012.06

Maple Leaf Student Union is responsible for organizing Christmas Party, holding Sports Week, sanitary examination, promoting events and serving as a bridge between students and school's administration department.

Popular student activities/clubs include: Ball hockey, Basketball, Music bands, Running club, Fitness club, Volleyball, Ping pong, Football, Drama club, Speech club, English café, Leadership, Art club, Student union, Maple Leaf Charity, Slo Pitch, Ultimate Frisbee, Coffee Press Newspaper, Maples Form Magazine, Cycling Club, Cooking Club, Kung Fu, Yoga and many more.

== Student services ==
=== Services for international students ===
- International Student Office
- Extensive campus tour upon arrival
- Tour of local area
- Academic counseling
- Personal counseling
- Assistance with explaining procedures and resolving any issues
- Student visa renewal and other legal requirements
- Field trips
- Social activities

=== Exchange program ===
Student exchanges with British Columbia (BC) Canada high schools are possible. This opportunity is unique as Canadian students may obtain an international experience in China and yet continue uninterrupted in their BC high-school program, taught by B.C. certified teachers and earn BC credits for their BC high school transcript and diploma.

=== Services regarding university/college applications ===
Graduates applying to study at universities or colleges in Canada receive study permits (student visas) through a streamlined process based on an agreement dealing with immigration issues signed by British Columbia and Citizenship and Immigration Canada.

=== Academic Counseling ===
The academic advisers at Dalian Maple Leaf International School are available to help students with course selection and post-secondary planning. The advisers meet individually with students to discuss their educational choices, assist in planning their career pathways, and guide them through the application process for universities and Colleges.

=== Student Residence ===
Full boarding options are available if required.

=== Annual University/College Recruitment Fair ===
Maple Leaf hosts Annual Maple Leaf International Schools University and College Recruitment Fair. Students and parents are welcomed to attend the event and talk to institution representatives in person in order to make their final post-secondary choices. Some institutions give offers to eligible students in the fair.

== See also ==
- Dalian
