= Dalian Jiaotong University =

University in Dalian, Liaoning, China

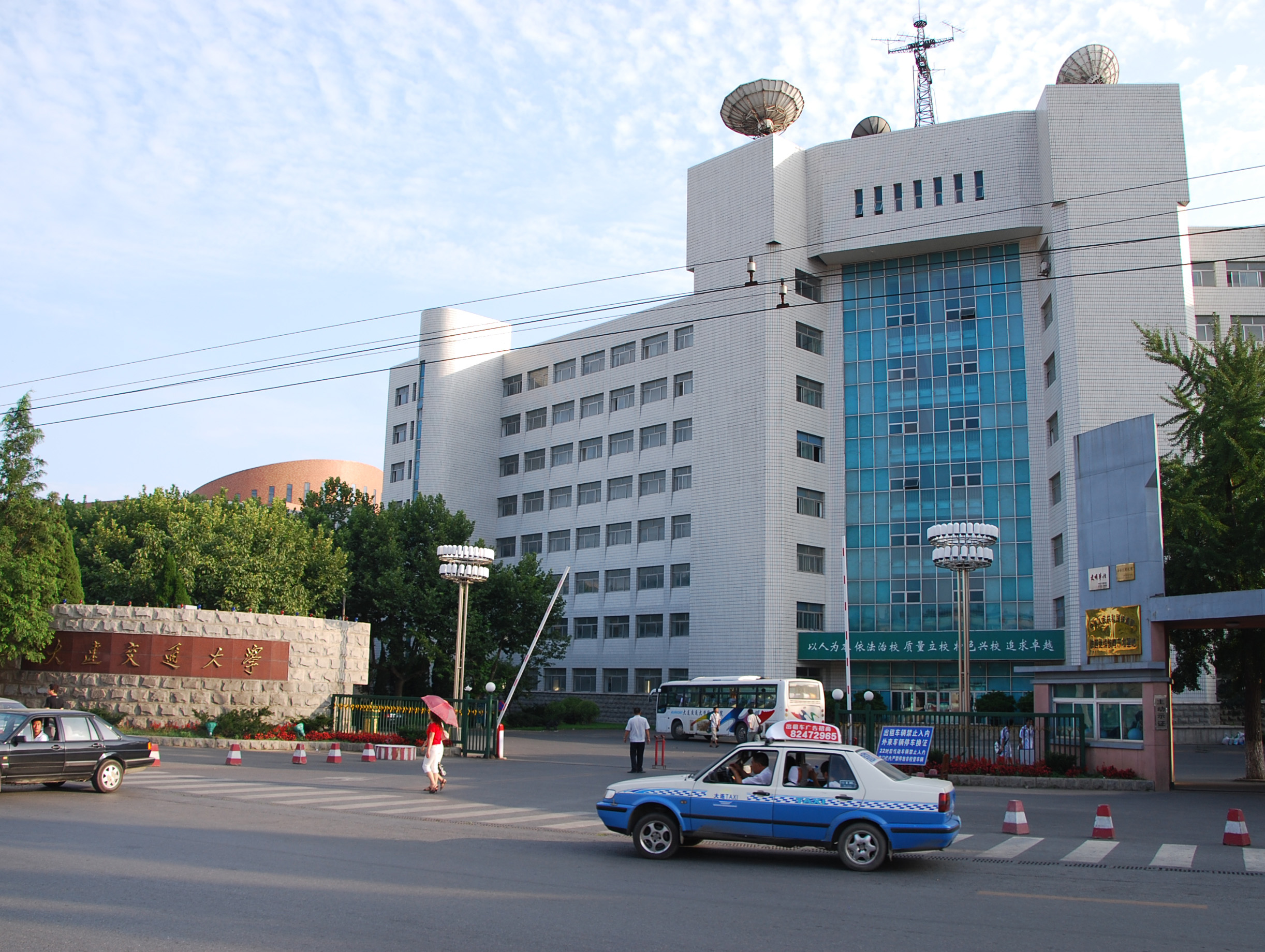
Main gate of Dalian Jiaotong University

Dalian Jiaotong University (Chinese: 大连交通大学; pinyin: Dàlián Jiāotōng Dàxué) is a university in Dalian, Liaoning, China. It is under the supervision of the provincial government and previously the Ministry of Railways. It has its main campus near downtown Dalian and a smaller campus in the Dalian Hi-tech Zone in Lüshunkou District. Until 2004, it was known as Dalian Railway Institute (Chinese: 大连铁道学院; pinyin: Dàlián Tiědào Xuéyuàn). Dalian Jiaotong University is the only university with a curriculum featuring rail transit in Northeast China.
