= Zhongshan Park (Dalian) =

Public park in Dalian, China

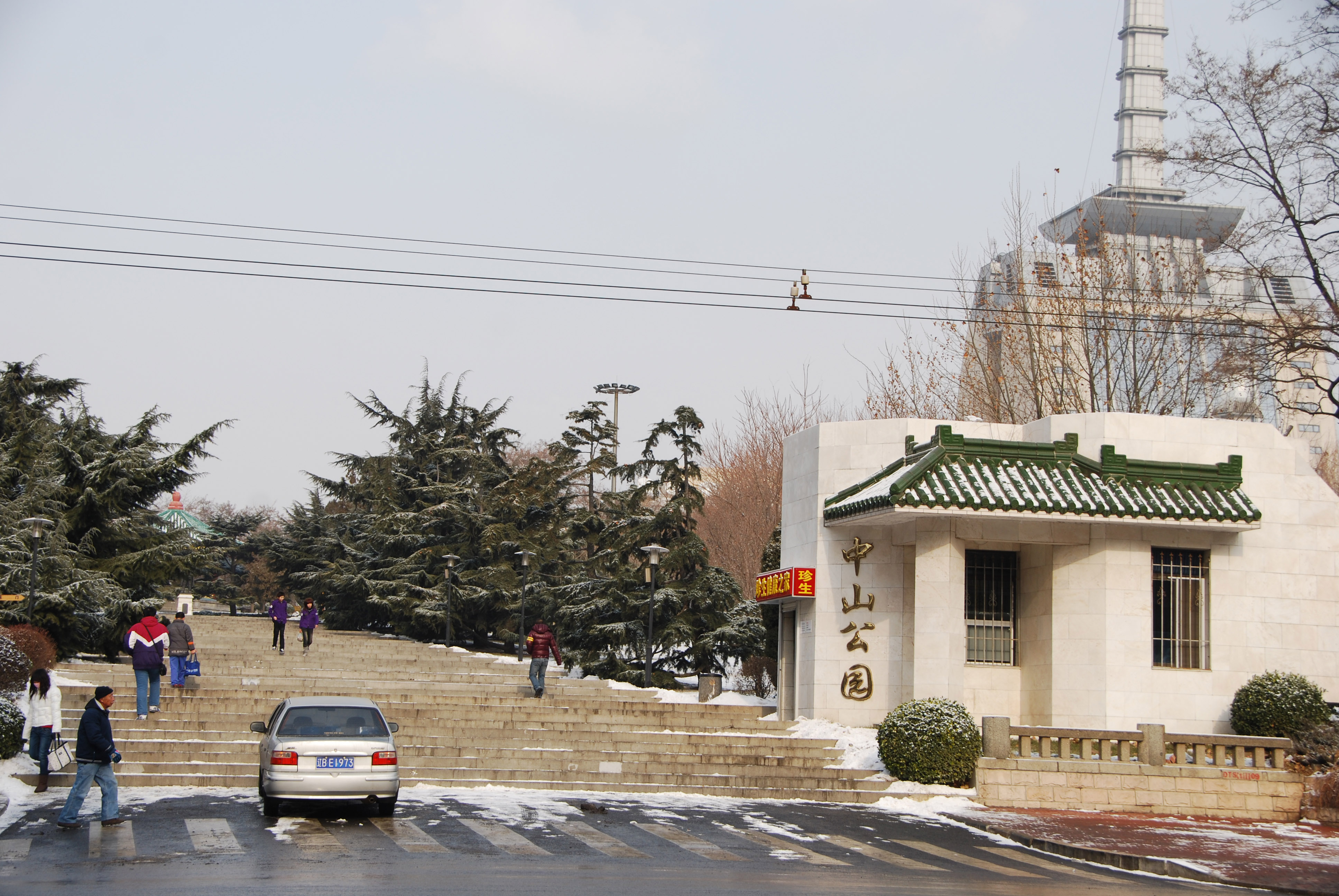
South entrance of Dalian Zhongshan Park, Dalian, China.

Dalian Zhongshan Park (in Chinese: 大连中山公园) is a public park in the Shahekou District of Dalian, Liaoning Province, China, named after Sun Zhongshan, the first president of the Republic of China.

Occupying 102,000 square metres (1,100,000 sq ft) of land, the park was established in 1911 in honor of Prince Shotoku during the period that Japan leased Dalian from the Qing Dynasty government. It was renamed Zhongshan Park in 1946.

== See also ==
- Dalian
- Sun Zhongshan
- Zhongshan Parks in the world
