= People's Square (Dalian) =

City square in Liaoning province, China

People's Square (Chinese: 人民广场; pinyin: Rénmín Guǎngchǎng) is a city square in Dalian, Liaoning province, China.

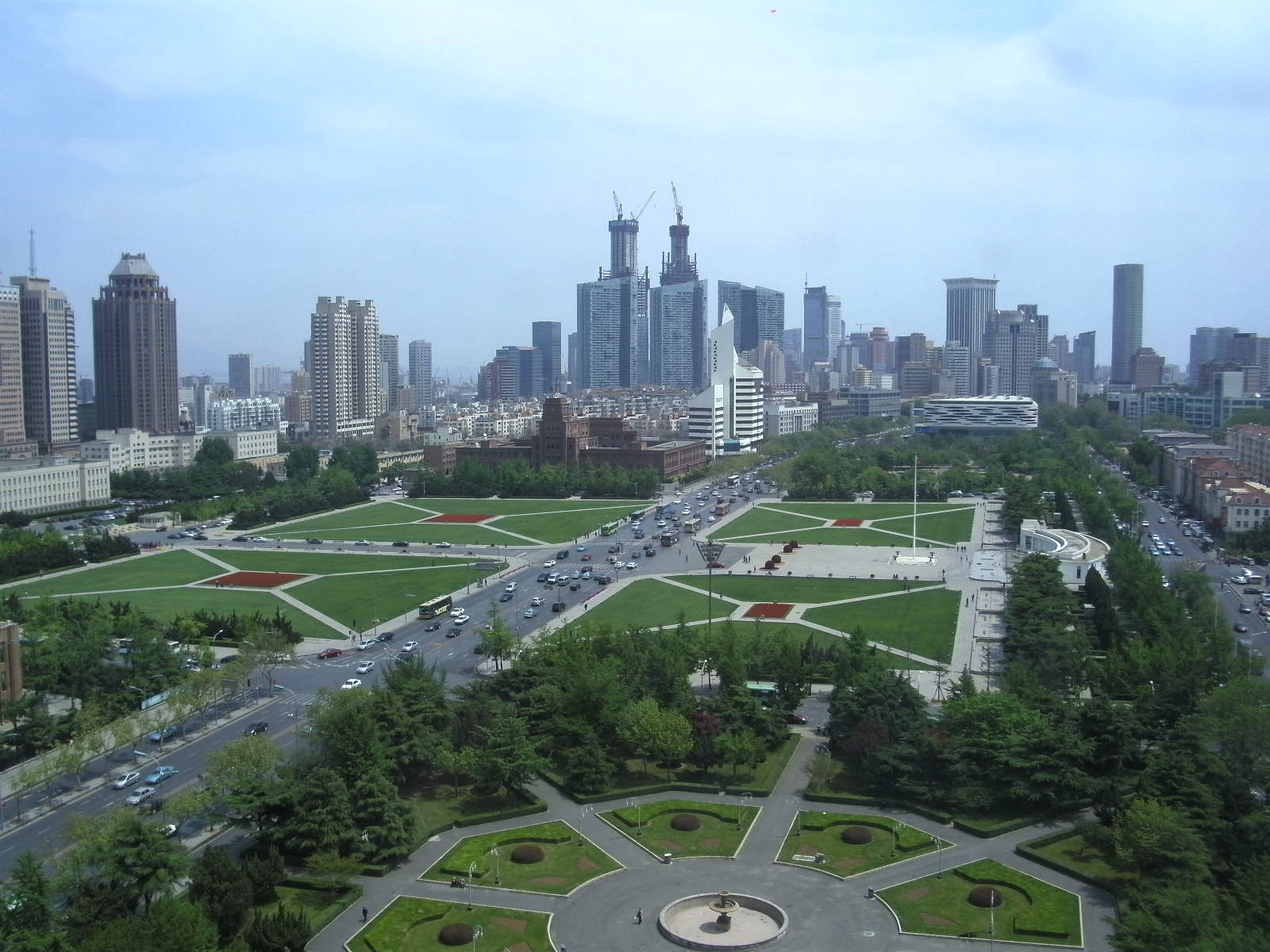
People's Square (Dalian)

It was initially built as the Dairen Tyouja Square (Chinese: 大连长者广场) by the occupying Japanese in 1914, changed to Dairen Government Square in 1945, renamed Dairen Stalin Square (Chinese: 大连斯大林广场) by the occupying Soviets in 1949, and finally renamed the People's Square in April 1999. It was the largest square in Dalian from 1914 to 1997, until the Xinghai Square was opened.
