= Dalian World Trade Center =

Skyscraper in Dalian, Liaoning, China

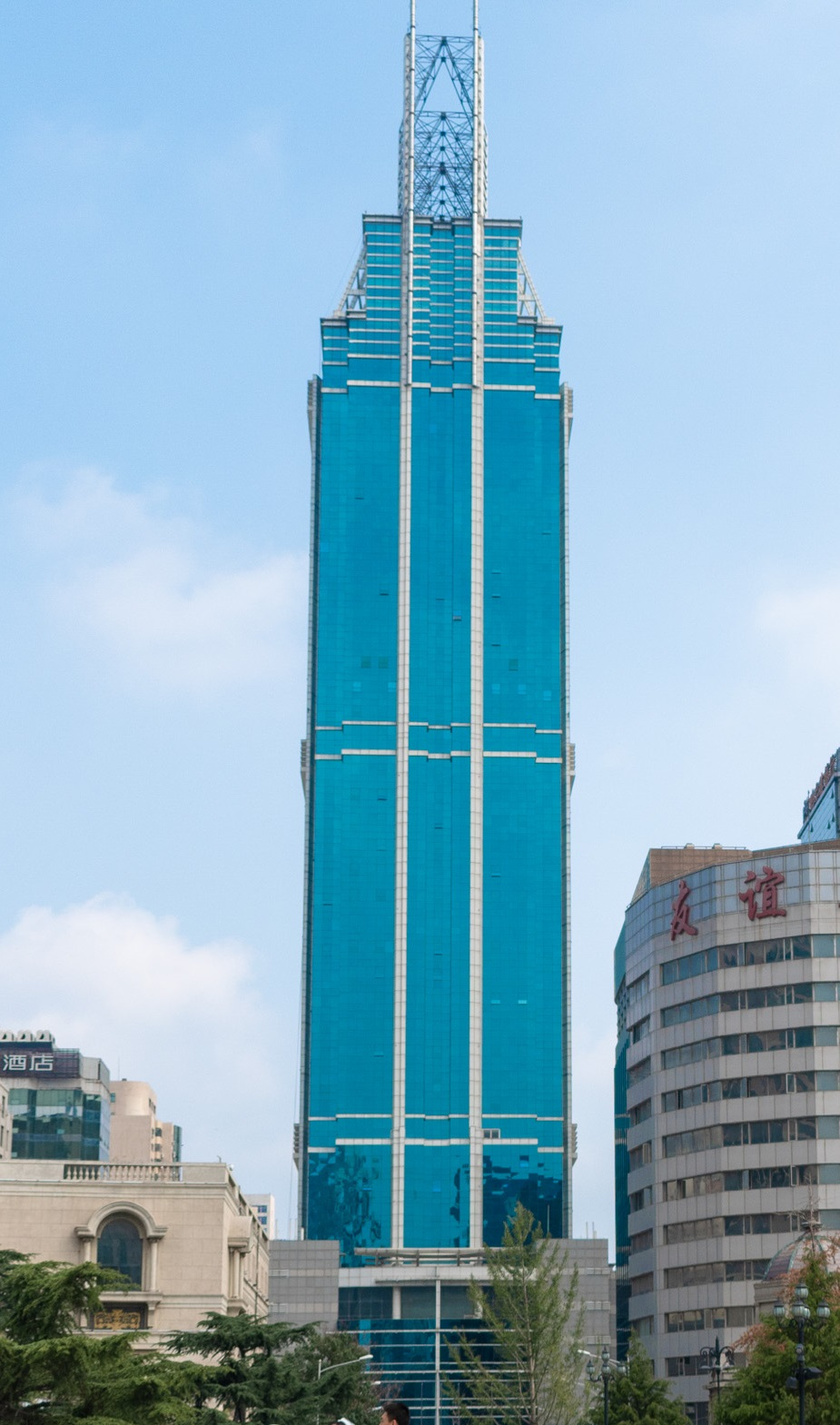
- Interactive map of the Dalian World Trade Center area

General information
- Status: Completed
- Type: Office
- Location: Dalian, China
- Coordinates: 38°55′24.3″N 121°38′29″E
- Construction started: 1997
- Completed: 2000

Height
- Antenna spire: 242 m (794 ft)

Technical details
- Floor count: 50

Design and construction
- Architect: Nadel Architects Inc.

Dalian World Trade Center (simplified Chinese: 大连世界贸易中心; traditional Chinese: 大連世界貿易中心; pinyin: Dàlián Shìjiè Màoyì Zhōngxīn) is a 50-floor, 242-meter (794 ft) tall skyscraper completed in 2000 located in Dalian, China.

== See also ==
- List of tallest buildings in the world
