= Dalian Futures Square 1 =

- Interactive map of the Dalian Futures Square 1 area

General information
- Status: Topped-out
- Location: Dalian, China
- Coordinates: 38°53′25.3″N 121°35′06.9″E

Height
- Antenna spire: 243 m (797 ft)

Technical details
- Floor count: 53

Dalian Futures Square 1 (simplified Chinese: 大连期货广场 1; traditional Chinese: 大連期貨廣場 1; pinyin: Dàlián Qīhuò Guǎngchǎng Yī) is a 53-floor, 243-meter (797 ft) tall skyscraper currently under construction in Dalian, China.

== See also ==
- List of tallest buildings in the world
