= Hongji Grand Stage =

Coordinates: 38.9256°N 121.6439°E

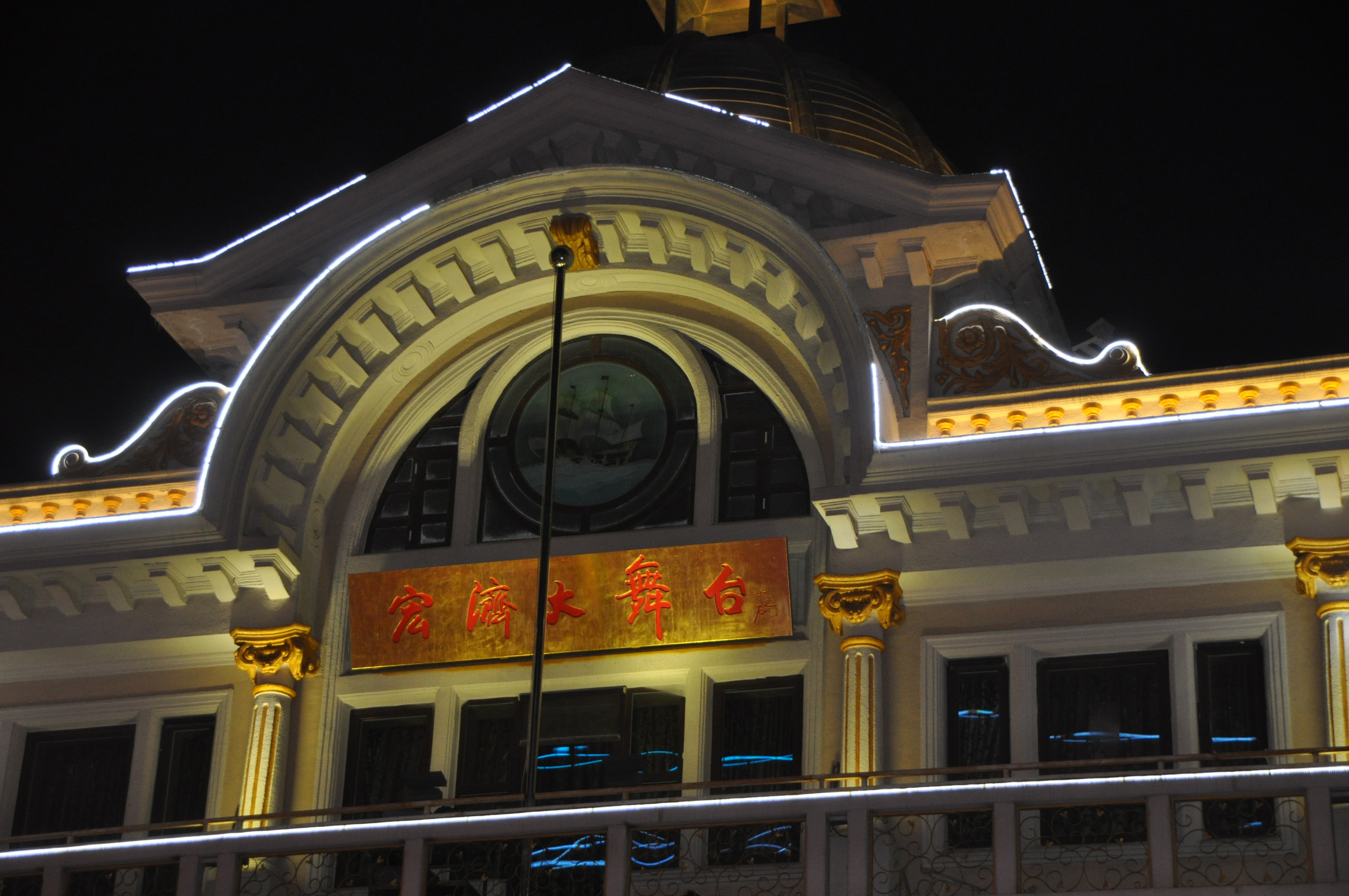
Hongji Grand Stage

Hongji Grand Stage (Chinese: 宏济大舞台) is the Beijing Opera house located in downtown Dalian, Liaoning, China.

== History ==
During the occupation of Dalian by Japan, there was a teahouse Tenfu Cha-en (Japanese: 天福茶園) at this location, now called 59 Minsheng Road, Zhongshan District, Dalian. In 1911, it changed its name to Hozen Cha-en (Japanese: 保善茶園) and later changed to Eizen Cha-en (Japanese: 永善茶園). Among the plays that were played there mostly in Japanese, there was also a Beijing Opera "Renmian Taohua" (Chinese: 人面桃花), played in Mandarin. A large-scale reconstruction begun in 1931 and was completed in 1933. In the following year, 1934, a grand opening of Kousai Daibutai (Chinese: 宏済大舞台, Hongji Dawutai in Chinese or Hongji Grand Stage in English) was held. Among the various plays for the grand opening, there was also a Beijing Opera "Peng-gong-an" (Chinese: 彭公案).

At the end of World War II, Hongji Grand Stage was confiscated by the City of Dalian, and, from 1949, was used as a club for the Dalian Police Department. In 1963, it became the Dalian Lu-Da Pingju Theater, and, in October 2010, returned to its former name of Hongji Grand Stage, which the Dalian Beijing Opera Company started to use as its main theater, after abandoning to use Qilin Grand Stage (Chinese: 麒麟大舞台), the former Higashi Hongan-ji Dalian Buddhist Temple.

In Dalian, there are other important theaters, such as Dalian People's Culture Club, Working People's Theater-Doudou Grand Stage (Chinese: 工人剧院/豆豆大舞台, mainly for Errenzhuan) and Development Area Grand Theater (Chinese: 开发区大剧院).

== Dalian Beijing Opera Company ==
Dalian Beijing Opera Company is the center of Beijing Opera in Dalian. Although Beijing Opera was played during Japan's occupation of Dalian 1905–1945, the company was established in April 1949 and changed its name to the current one in May 2007.

== Gallery ==
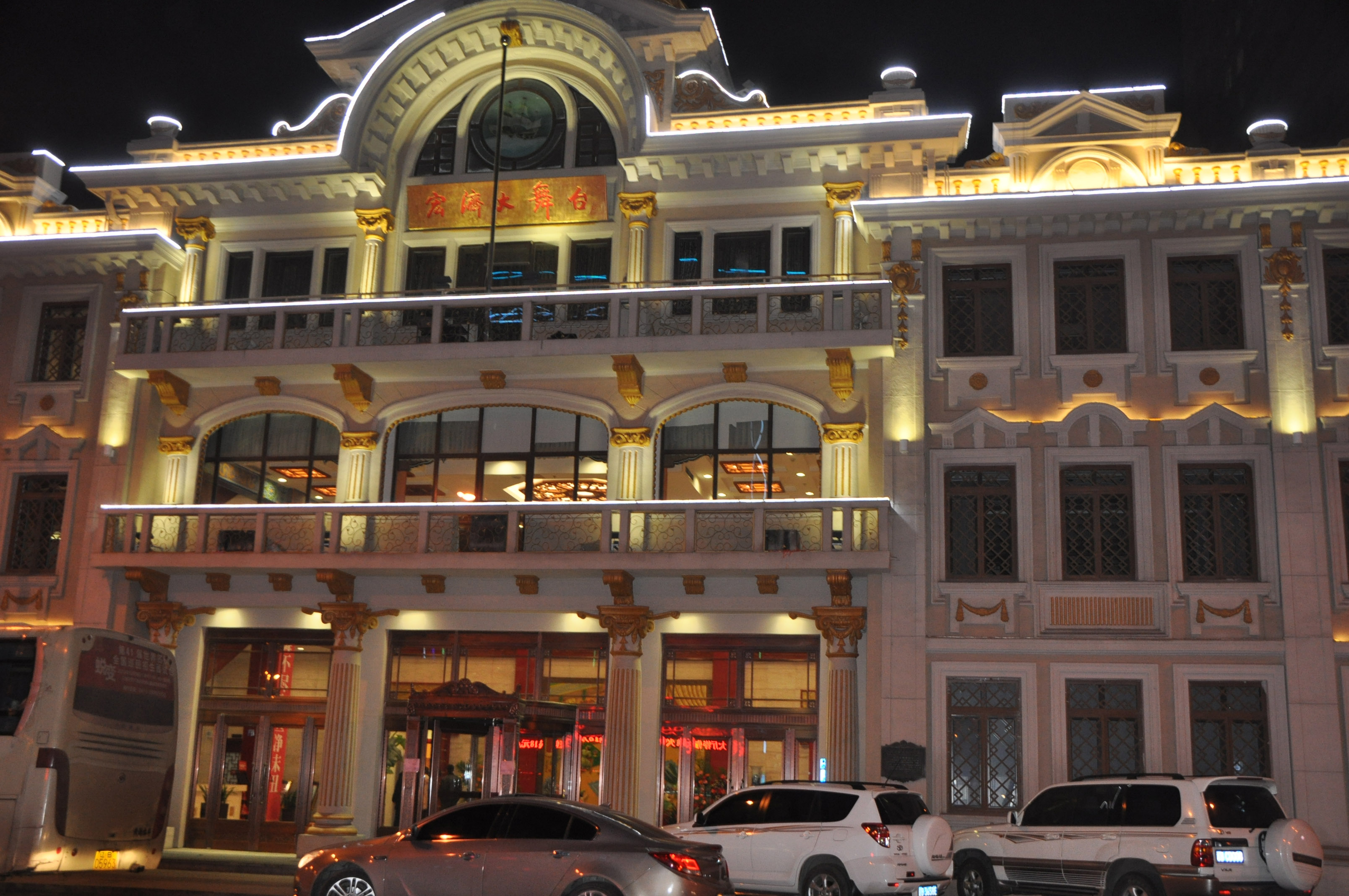
Hongji Grand Stage in the evening

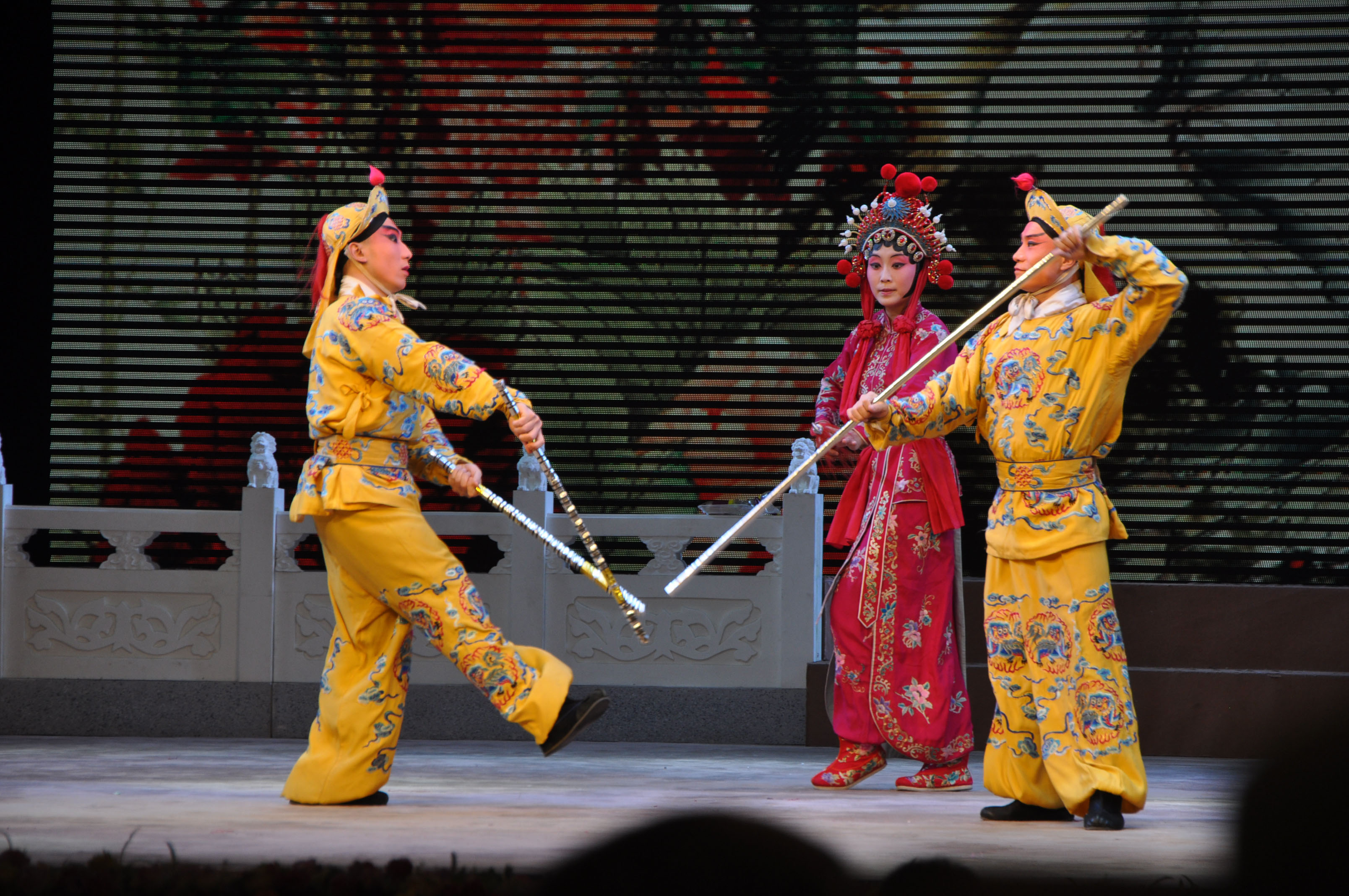
Beijing Opera "Guifei Drunk with Wine" (Chinese: 贵妃醉酒) being played

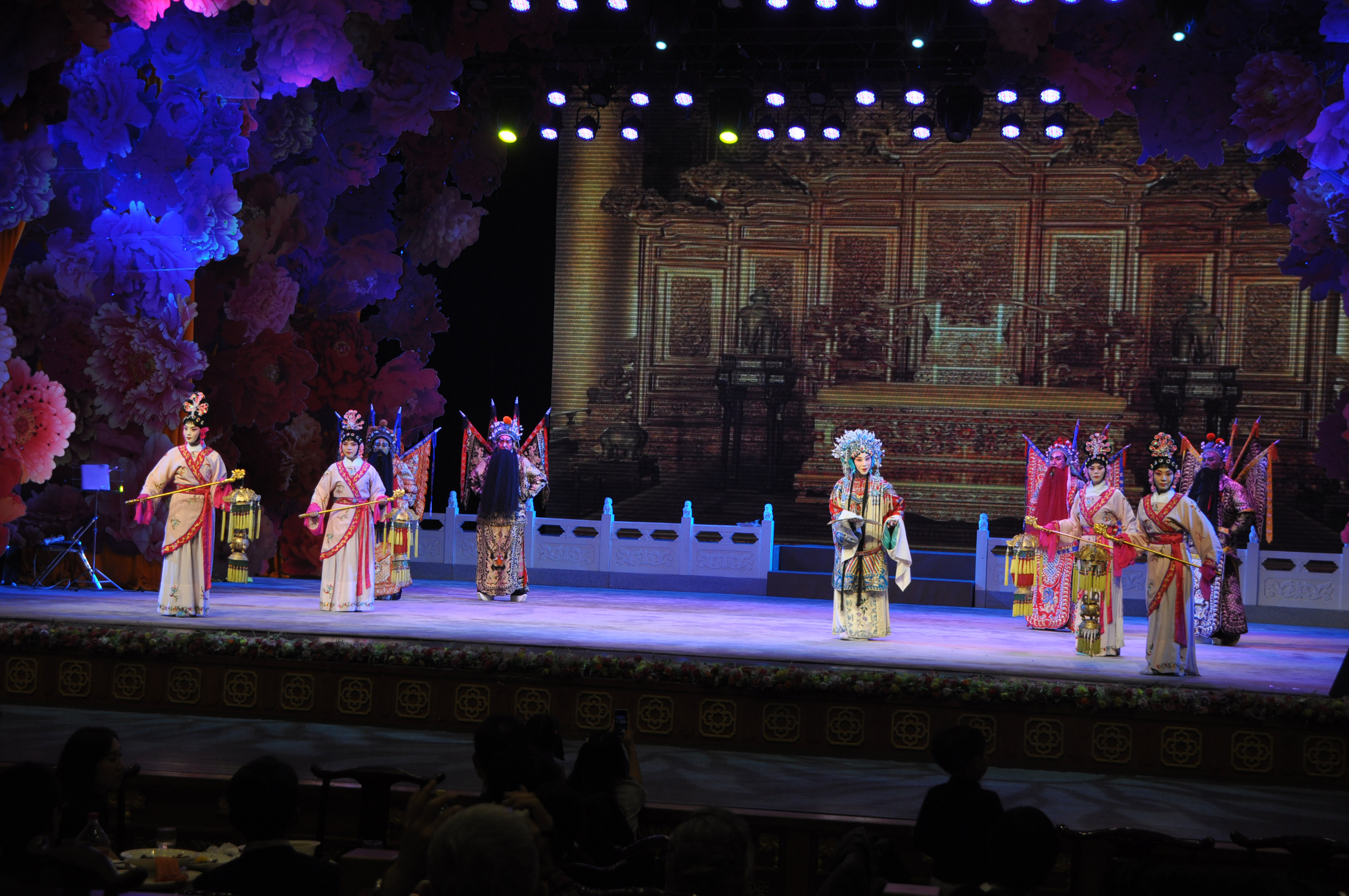
Beijing Opera "Guifei Drunk with Wine" being played

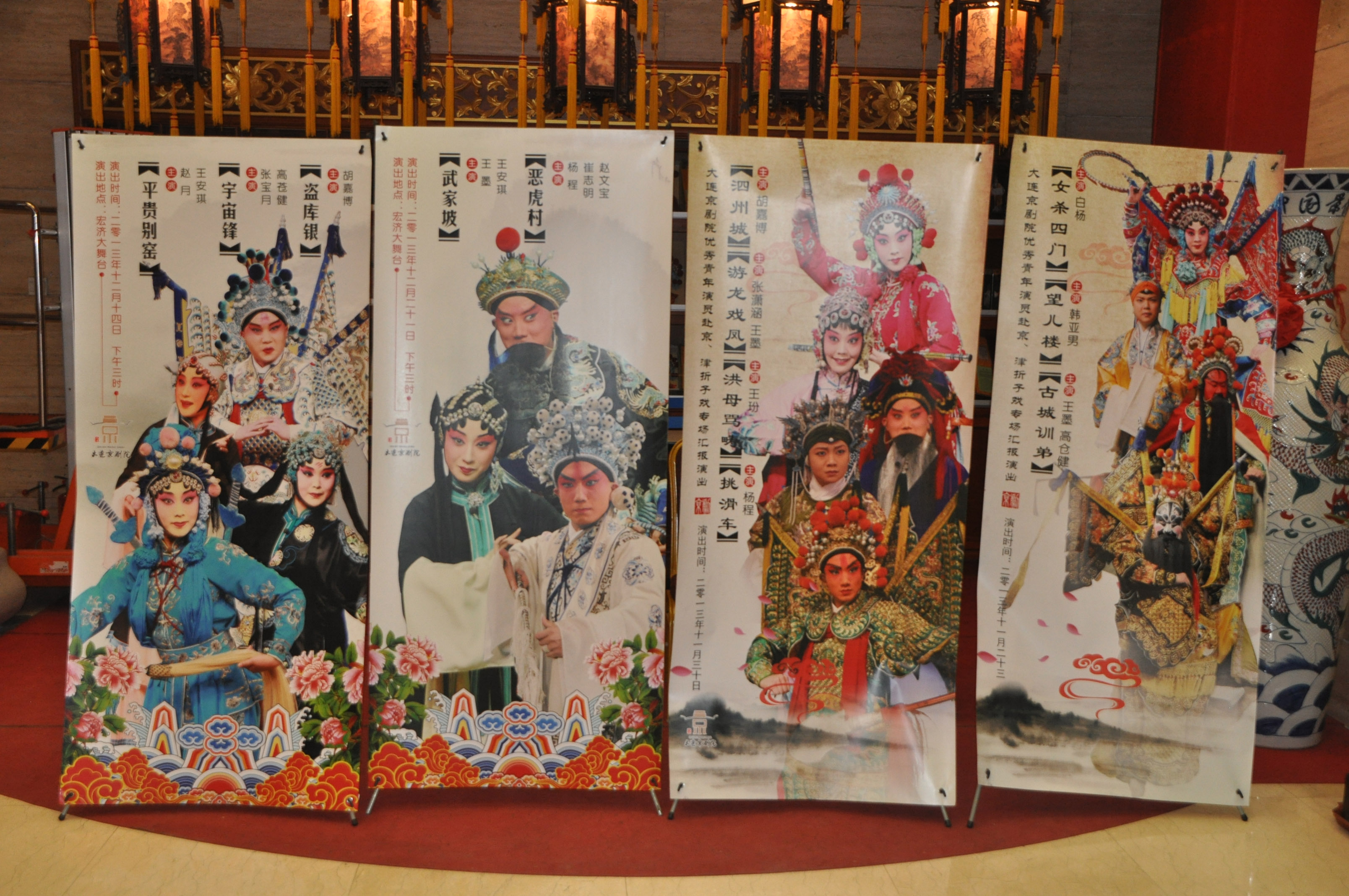
The schedule of Beijing Operas

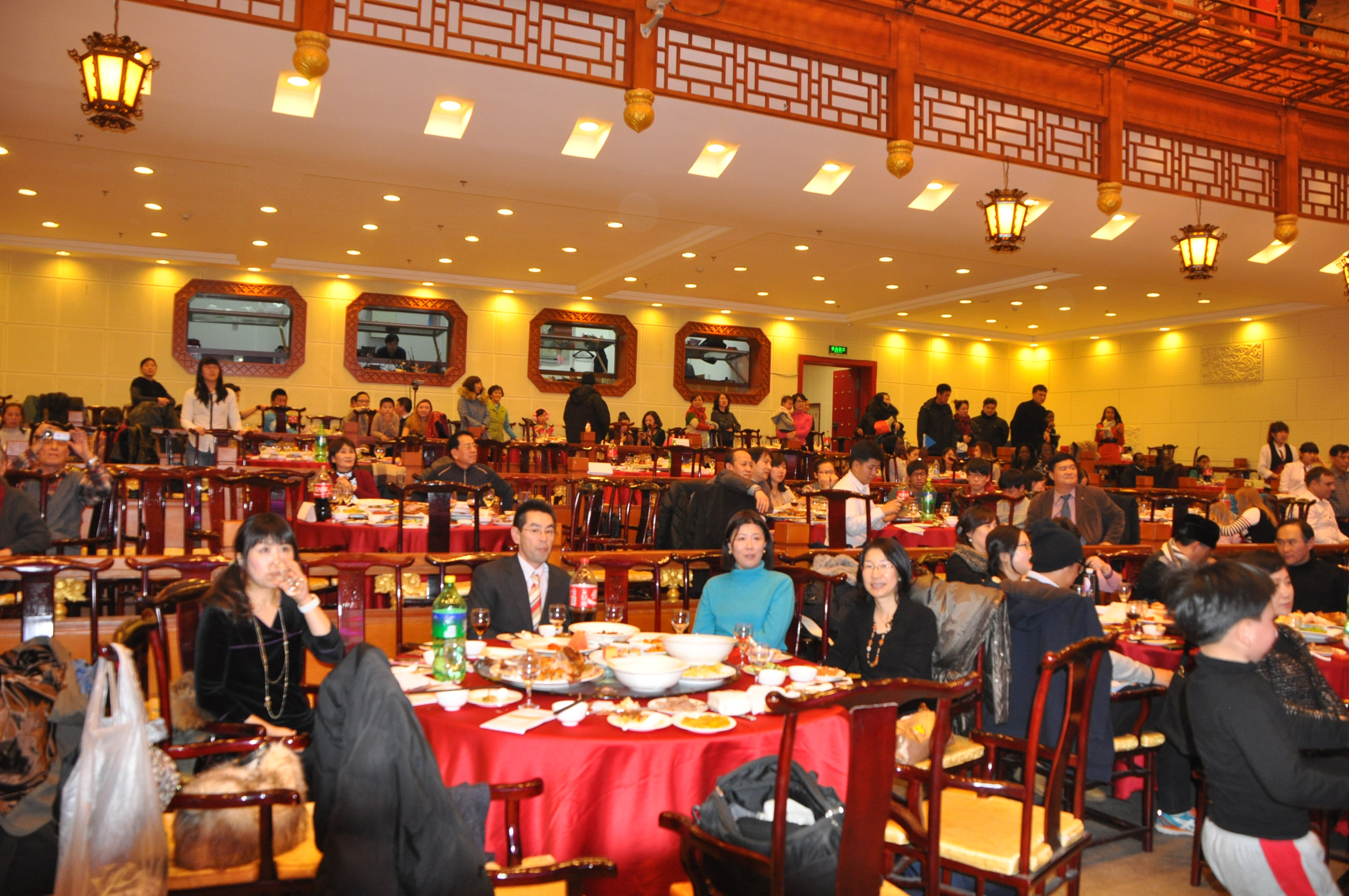
A dinner party with Beijing Opera
