= Dalian International Trade Center =

Supertall skyscraper in Dalian, Liaoning, China

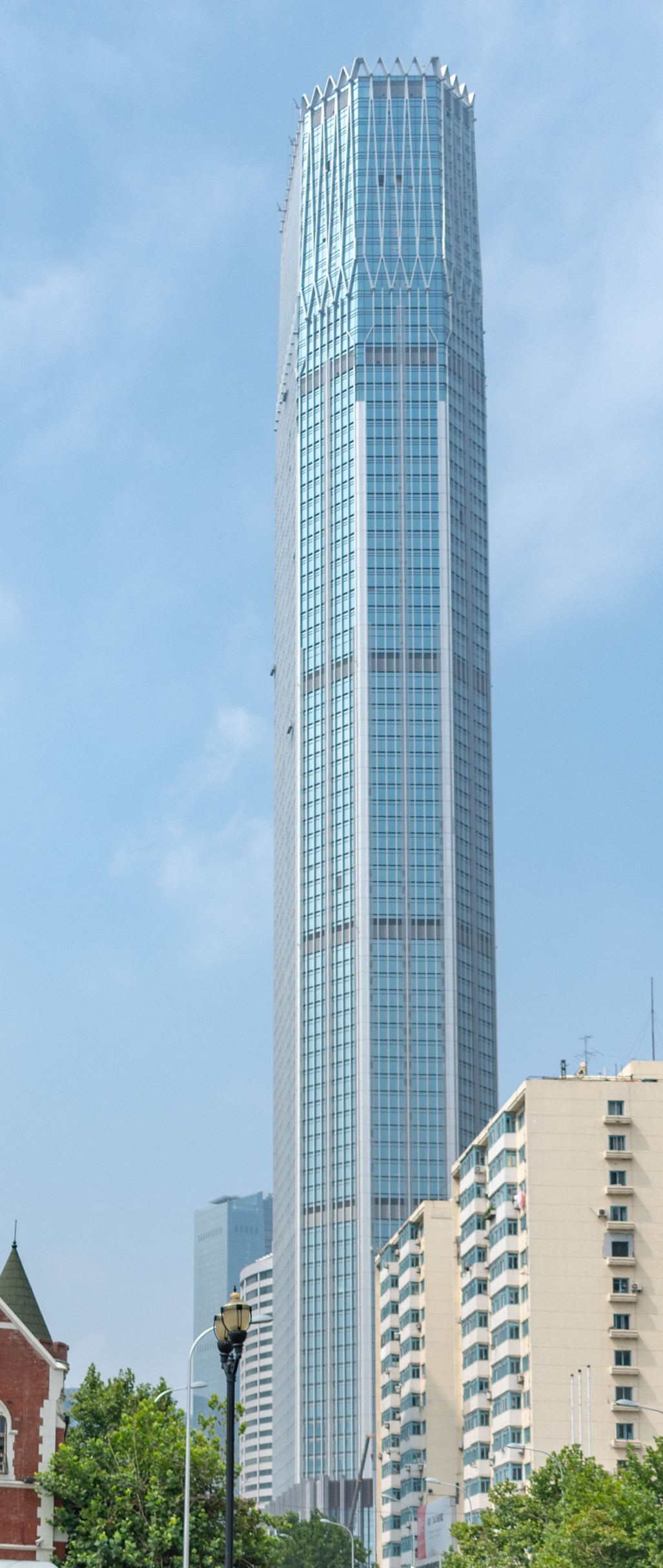
- Interactive map of the Dalian International Trade Center area

General information
- Status: Completed
- Type: Mixed-use
- Location: Dalian, Liaoning, China
- Construction started: July 21, 2003
- Opening: 2019

Height
- Height: 370.2 m (1,215 ft)

Technical details
- Floor count: 86; 7 below ground
- Floor area: 321,000 m^{2} (3,460,000 sq ft)

Design and construction
- Architects: Dalian Architectural Design & Research Institute
- Main contractor: Shanghai Construction Group

The Dalian International Trade Center (simplified Chinese: 大连国际贸易中心; traditional Chinese: 大連國際貿易中心; pinyin: Dàlián Guójì Màoyì Zhōngxīn) is a supertall skyscraper designed by architecture firm HOK in Dalian, Liaoning, China.

The Dalian ITC has a total height of 370 m (1,210 ft), with 86 stories. Construction began on July 21, 2003, site on opposite side of road in restarted construction on April 6, 2012 and was topped-out in 2017. The building was completed in 2019.
