= Hengyuan Community =

Hengyuan 恒苑社区
- Community
- Country: China
- Province: Liaoning
- Prefecture: Dalian
- District: Shahekou
- Subdistrict: Malan

Area
  - Total: 0.17 km^{2} (0.066 sq mi)

Population
  - Total: 7,018
  - Density: 41,000/km^{2} (110,000/sq mi)
- Time zone: UTC+8 (China Standard Time)
- Division code: 210204008017

Hengyuan Community is a residential community in Malan Subdistrict, Shahekou District, Dalian, Liaoning, China. As of 2014, the community spans an area of 0.17 square kilometres (0.066 mi^{2}), and has a population of 7,018. In 2019, the community was moved from Xinggong Subdistrict to Malan Subdistrict.
