= Daqing (disambiguation) =

Daqing is a prefecture-level city in Heilongjiang, China, known for its Daqing Oil Field.

Daqing may also refer to:

- Daqing Station, a railway station in South District, Taichung, Taiwan
- Daqing Subdistrict, Mudanjiang, a subdistrict in Aimin District, Mudanjiang, Heilongjiang, China
- Daqing Subdistrict, Bengbu, a subdistrict in Yuhui District, Bengbu, Anhui, China
- Daqing Community, a community in Xinggong Subdistrict, Shahekou District, Dalian, Liaoning, China

== Historical eras ==
- Daqing (1036–1038), era name used by Emperor Jingzong of Western Xia
- Daqing (1140–1143), era name used by Emperor Renzong of Western Xia
- Qing dynasty (1644–1912), also known as "Da Qing" or "Daqing"

== People ==
- Fu Daqing (fl. 20th century), Chinese propagandist
- Daqing Wan (born 1964), Chinese mathematician
- Wang Daqing (born 1989), Chinese triathlete
- Zhang Daqing (born 1969), Chinese amateur astronomer
- Zhu Daqing (born 1990), Chinese Paralympic athlete

== See also ==
- Taching (disambiguation)
