= Xishan Community =

Xishan 西山社区
- Community
- Country: China
- Province: Liaoning
- Prefecture: Dalian
- District: Shahekou
- Subdistrict: Malan

Area
  - Total: 0.44 km^{2} (0.17 sq mi)

Population
  - Total: 14,630
  - Density: 33,000/km^{2} (86,000/sq mi)
- Time zone: UTC+8 (China Standard Time)
- Division code: 210204008019

Xishan Community is a village-level division of the Malan Subdistrict of Shahekou District, Dalian, Liaoning, China.
