= Yongji Community =

Yongji 永吉社区
- Community
- Country: China
- Province: Liaoning
- Prefecture: Dalian
- District: Shahekou
- Subdistrict: Xi'an Road

Area
  - Total: 0.18 km^{2} (0.069 sq mi)

Population
  - Total: 9,549
  - Density: 53,000/km^{2} (140,000/sq mi)
- Time zone: UTC+8 (China Standard Time)
- Division code: 210204018013

Yongji Community is a village-level division of the Xi'an Road Subdistrict of Shahekou District, Dalian, Liaoning, China.
