= Ruyi Community =

Ruyi 如意社区
- Community
- Country: China
- Province: Liaoning
- Prefecture: Dalian
- District: Shahekou
- Subdistrict: Xi'an Road

Area
  - Total: 0.29 km^{2} (0.11 sq mi)

Population
  - Total: 10,543
  - Density: 36,000/km^{2} (94,000/sq mi)
- Time zone: UTC+8 (China Standard Time)
- Division code: 210204018012

Ruyi Community is a village-level division of the Xi'an Road Subdistrict of Shahekou District, Dalian, Liaoning, China.
