= Quanyong Community =

Quanyong 泉涌社区
- Community
- Country: China
- Province: Liaoning
- Prefecture: Dalian
- District: Shahekou
- Subdistrict: Xi'an Road

Population
  - Total: 11,772
- Time zone: UTC+8 (China Standard Time)
- Division code: 210204018014

Quanyong Community is a village-level division of the Xi'an Road Subdistrict of Shahekou District, Dalian, Liaoning, China.
