= Hongfa Community =

Hongfa 宏发社区
- Community
- Country: China
- Province: Liaoning
- Prefecture: Dalian
- District: Shahekou
- Subdistrict: Malan

Population
  - Total: 8,541
- Time zone: UTC+8 (China Standard Time)
- Division code: 210204008020

Hongfa Community is a village-level division of the Malan Subdistrict of Shahekou District, Dalian, Liaoning, China.
