= Xingsheng Community =

Xingsheng 兴盛社区
- Community
- Country: China
- Province: Liaoning
- Prefecture: Dalian
- District: Shahekou
- Subdistrict: Xi'an Road

Area
  - Total: 1.29 km^{2} (0.50 sq mi)

Population
  - Total: 6,744
  - Density: 5,230/km^{2} (13,500/sq mi)
- Time zone: UTC+8 (China Standard Time)
- Division code: 210204018011

Xingsheng Community is a village-level division of the Xi'an Road Subdistrict of Shahekou District, Dalian, Liaoning, China.
