= Xingxin Community =

Xingxin Community 兴新社区
- Community

Chinese transcription(s)
  - Chinese: 兴新社区
  - Pinyin: Xīngxīn shèqū
- Interactive map of Xingxin Community
- Country: China
- Province: Liaoning
- Prefecture: Dalian
- District: Shahekou
- Subdistrict: Xi'an Road

Area
  - Total: 0.34 km^{2} (0.13 sq mi)

Population
  - Total: 7,947
  - Density: 23,000/km^{2} (61,000/sq mi)
- Time zone: UTC+8 (China Standard Time)
- Division code: 210204018009

Xingxin Community is a village-level division of the Xi'an Road Subdistrict of Shahekou District, Dalian, Liaoning, China.
