= Xinghai Square =

City square in Dalian, China

Coordinates: 38°52′52″N 121°34′58″E

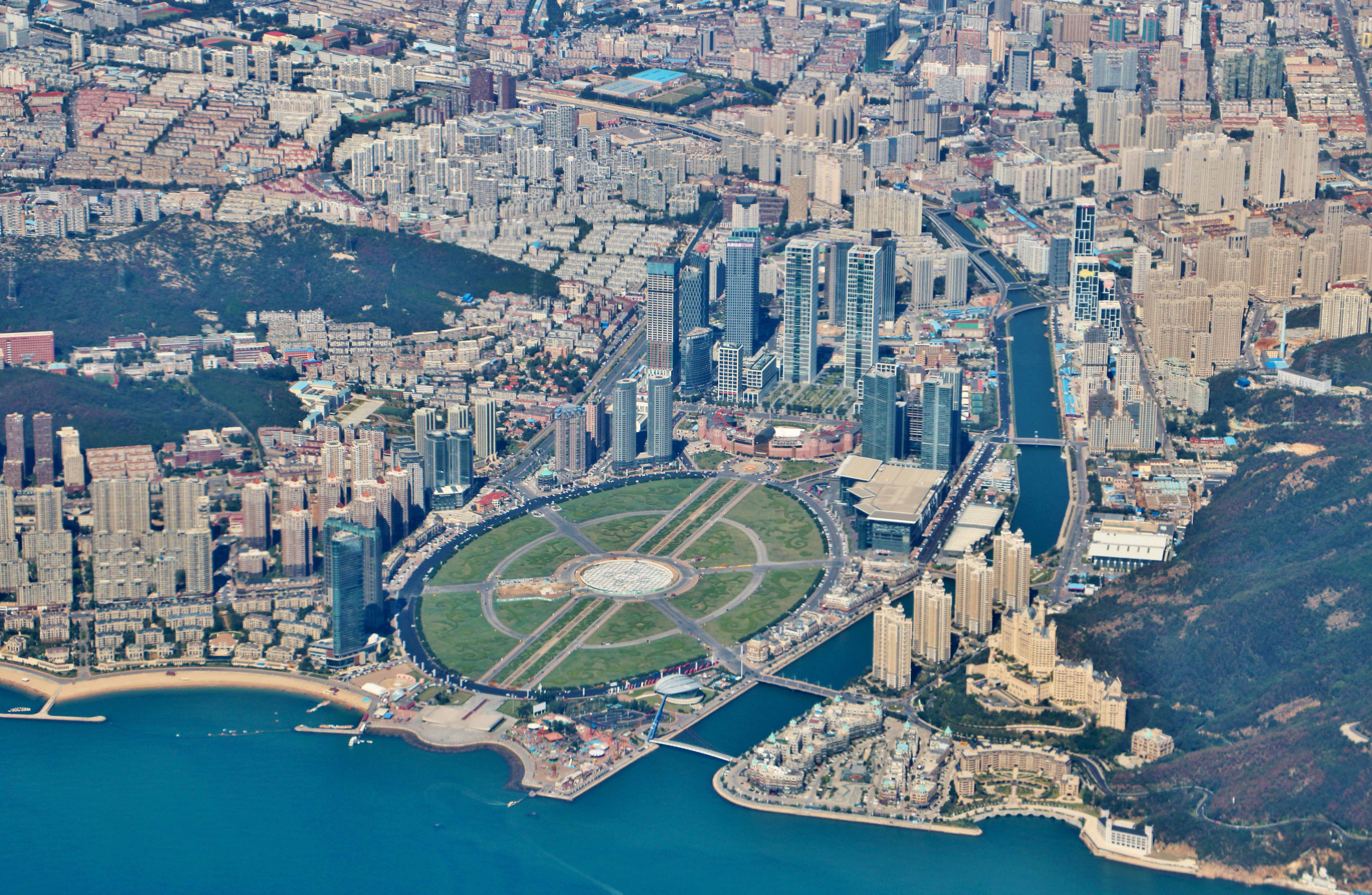
Bird's-eye view of Xinghai Square

Xinghai Square (simplified Chinese: 星海广场; traditional Chinese: 星海廣場; pinyin: Xīnghǎi Guǎngchǎng) is a city square in Dalian, Liaoning, China. It is located to the north of Xinghai Bay. It covers a total area of 110 ha (270 acres), created entirely through land reclamation, making it the largest city square in the world. Its name literally means "the Sea of Stars".

== Location ==
Xinghai Square is located in the central part of the southern coast of Shahekou District, Dalian. The square is located about 1 km from Baiyun Mountain in the east, 1 km from Xinghai Park in the west, 1 km from Xinghai Bay Bridge in the south, and 4.5 km from the city center (Qingniwa CBD) in the north. The main road passing through the square is Zhongshan Road.

== History ==
On 30 June 1997, the Xinghai Square project was completed and the square was opened to the public for free, and for the next day, to commemorate the handover of Hong Kong, the Xinghai Bay Renovation Project started. The Dalian Municipal Government used construction waste to carry out land reclamation projects and planned the construction of Xinghai Square.

== Design ==
=== Overall layout ===
The landscape of Xinghai Square is divided into four parts: Xinghai Square, Musical Fountain, Centennial City Sculpture and Central Lawn. There are three circular roads in the middle of Xinghai Square, dividing the landscape into three levels. There are two parallel roads running through the square on the long axis of the square, and there are two X-shaped roads intersecting it and dividing it into six Parts.

=== Design philosophy ===
Xinghai Square encloses a circle in the oval road network. The inner circle has a diameter of 199.9 meters, which symbolizes the 100th anniversary of Dalian in 1999. The outer circle has a diameter of 239.9 meters, which means that Dalian's 500th anniversary of establishment in 2399. The center of the square draws on the design concept of the circular mound altar of the Temple of Heaven in Beijing. It is paved with 999 pieces of Sichuan red marble and the marbles are carved with patterns of the Heavenly Stems and Earthly Branches, the Solar Terms, and the Chinese Zodiac. In addition, there are nine tripods with different patterns, and each tripod has a large character carved on. The nine characters carved on the nine tripods consist of a sentence “中华民族大团结万岁” (English: "Long live the great unity of the Chinese Nation" which shows the unity of Chinese people.

=== Design parameter ===
The diameter of the north–south direction is 1010 meters and the diameter of the north-east direction is 630 meters. The total area of the square is 1.76 million square meters. The lawn covers an area of 850,000 square meters, which accounts for 77.3% of the total area of the square.

== Landmarks ==
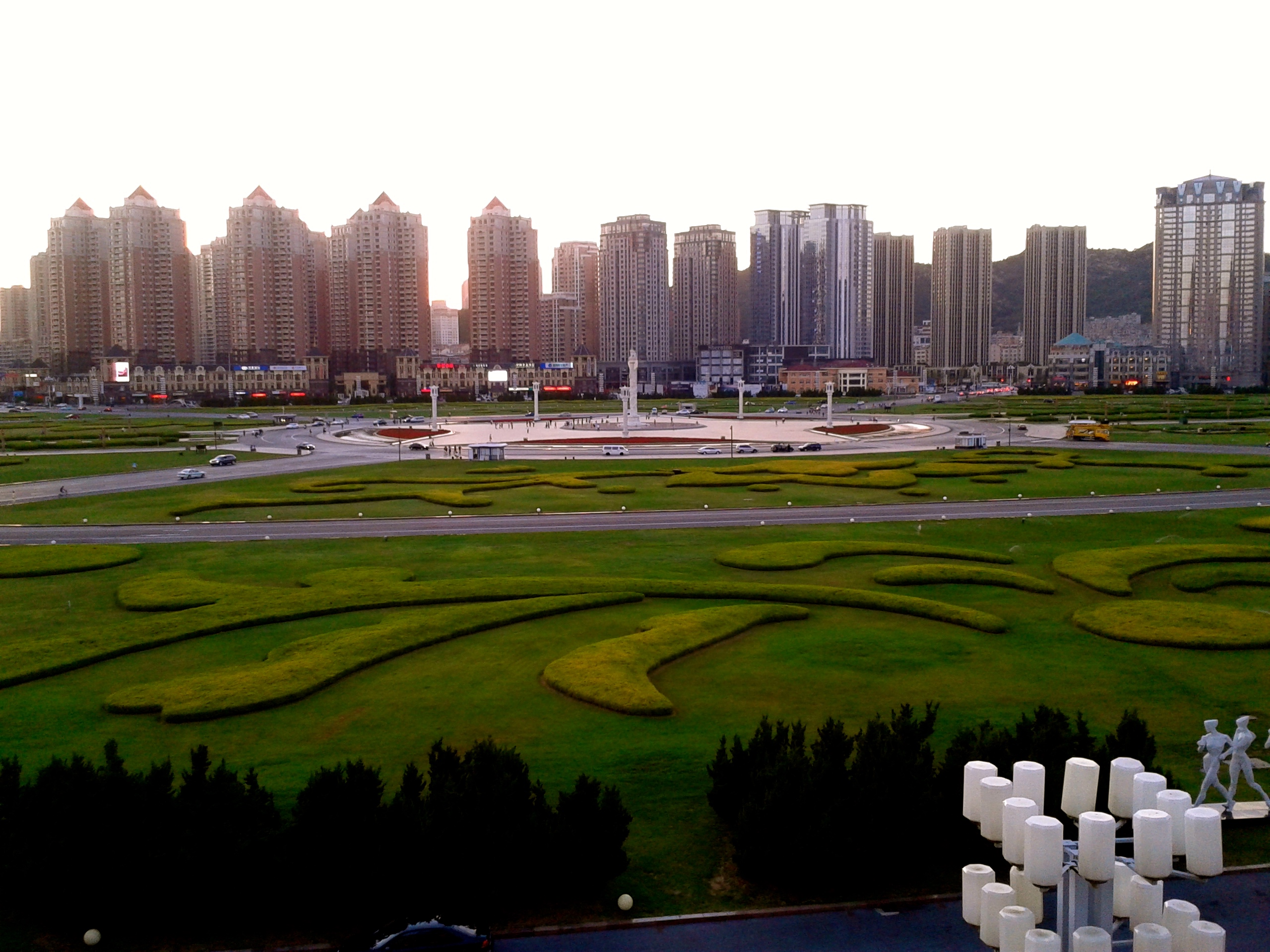
Xinghai Square

=== Surrounding buildings ===
Around the square are high-end apartments, restaurants, banks, luxury sports car dealers and an amusement park. Located on the opposite side of the sculpture complex is the Xinghai CBD, which houses among other things Dalian Xinghai Convention & Exhibitions Center, Dalian World Expo Center and the headquarters of Dalian Commodity Exchange.

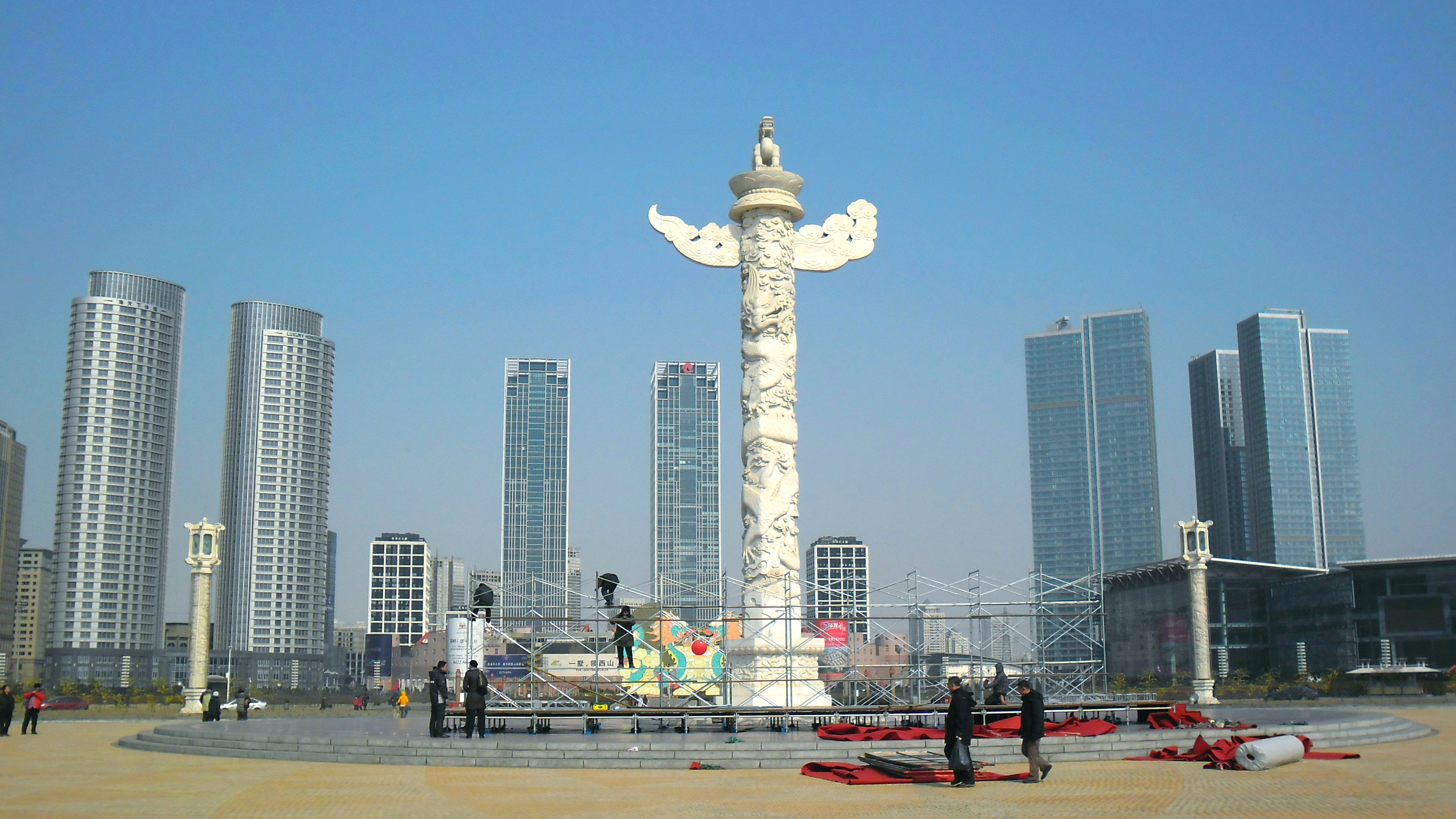
The now demolished huabiao

=== Huabiao ===
A huabiao was once located at the center of the square. It was first built in 1997 to commemorate the handover of Hong Kong. It was the tallest huabiao in China, and became one of the landmarks and symbols of Dalian. It stood at a height of 19.97 meters, and had a diameter of 1.997 metres. It was demolished secretly on August 5, 2016, at midnight, which was believed to be out of political reasons related to the downfall of Chinese politician Bo Xilai, who oversaw the construction of Xinghai Square and the central huabiao during his tenure as the mayor of Dalian. Local media remained in silence about this, and reports by mainland media were soon deleted.

=== Musical fountain ===
On November 26, 2017, Xinghai Square opened a new musical fountain at the center of the square as a replacement of the demolished huabiao. It is known as the largest musical fountain in Northeast China. The Xinghai Square musical fountain is the third musical fountain in downtown Dalian, the other two are in Donggang and Renmin Square.

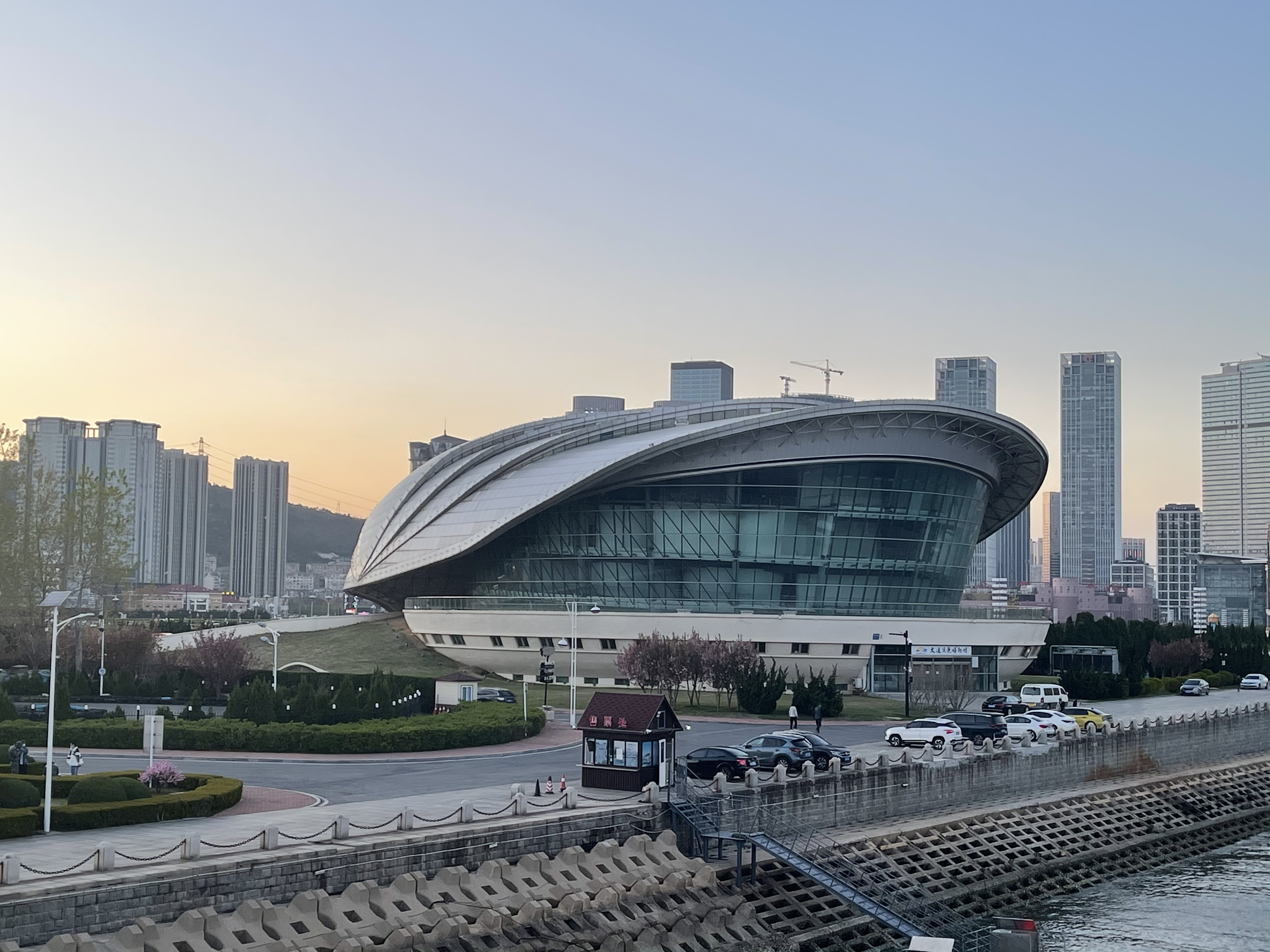
Dalian Shell Museum

=== Dalian Shell Museum ===
Dalian Shell Museum was officially opened on Xinghai Square in 2015. The shape of the building is a lying shell. There are more than 10,000 kinds and more than 50,000 pieces of exhibits in the museum. Dalian Shell Museum is the one with the largest exhibition area and the most variety on display in the world so far.

== Sculptures ==
Xinghai Square has various kinds of sculptures, such as the Centennial City Sculpture, the sculpture of 1000 footprints, and modern movement sculptures. The Centennial City Sculpture, along with the sculpture of 1000 footprints leading up to it, was built in 1999 to commemorate the centenary of the founding of the city (1899–1999).

=== Centennial City Sculpture ===
The Centennial City Sculpture is located from the center of the square to the south. It is an opened-book shaped stone sculpture, with relief and line curving at either end which show both traditional Chinese culture and modern Chinese progress. The book is faced to the sea, signifying Dalian turning a new page after the Centenary anniversary.

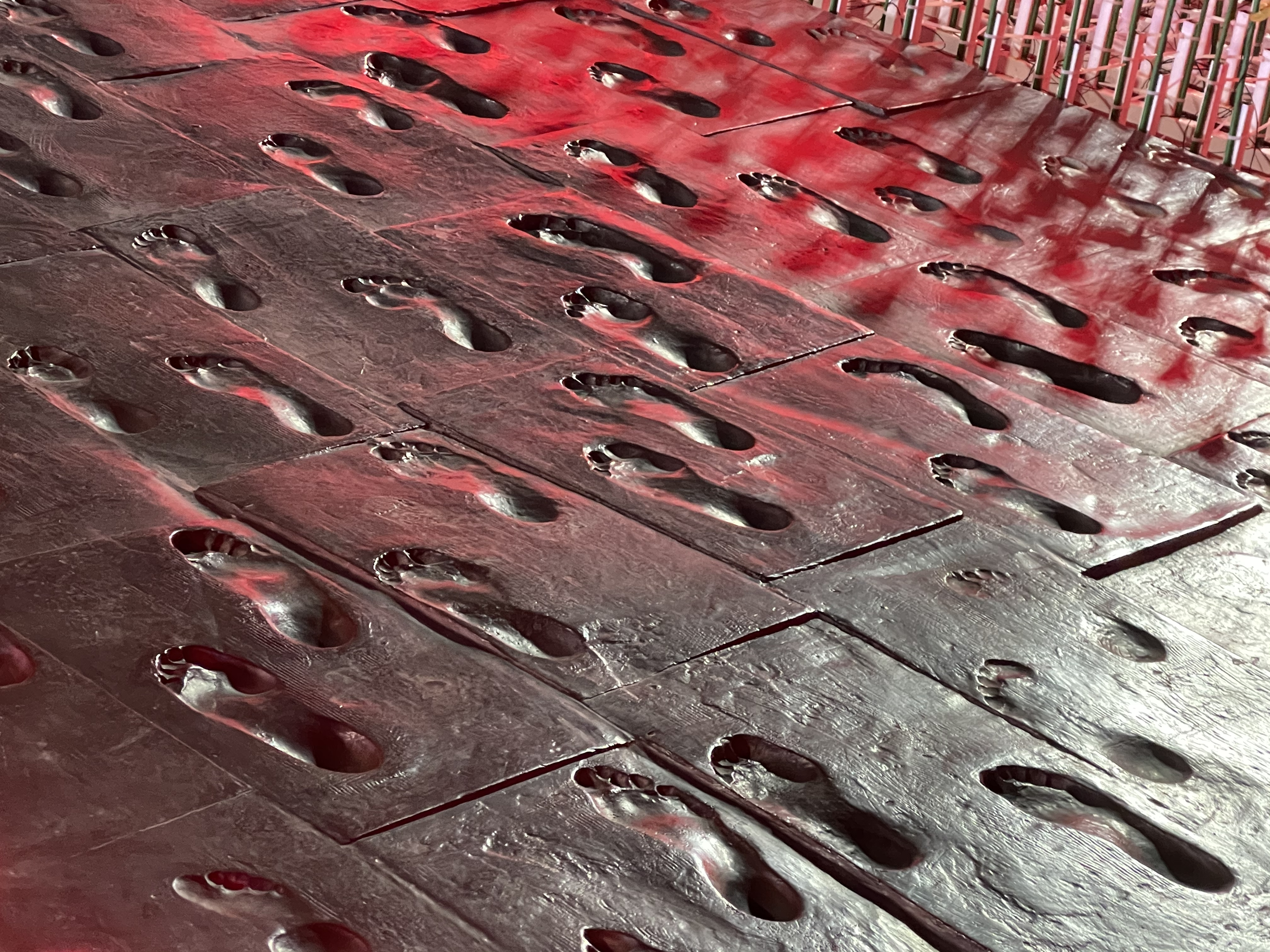
The sculpture of 1000 footprints

=== The sculpture of 1000 footprints ===
Leading up to the Centennial City Sculpture is a ground-level copper sculpture of 1000 footprints, which were stepped by 1000 Dalianese people of different ages. From the north to the south, footprints were ordered by age from the oldest to the youngest. The footprint in the first line belongs to Dalianese people who were born in 1899 when Dalian as a city was established, and the one in the last line belongs to Dalianese people who were born in 1999. The 1000 footprints shows Dalian's century-long history created by its industrious citizens.

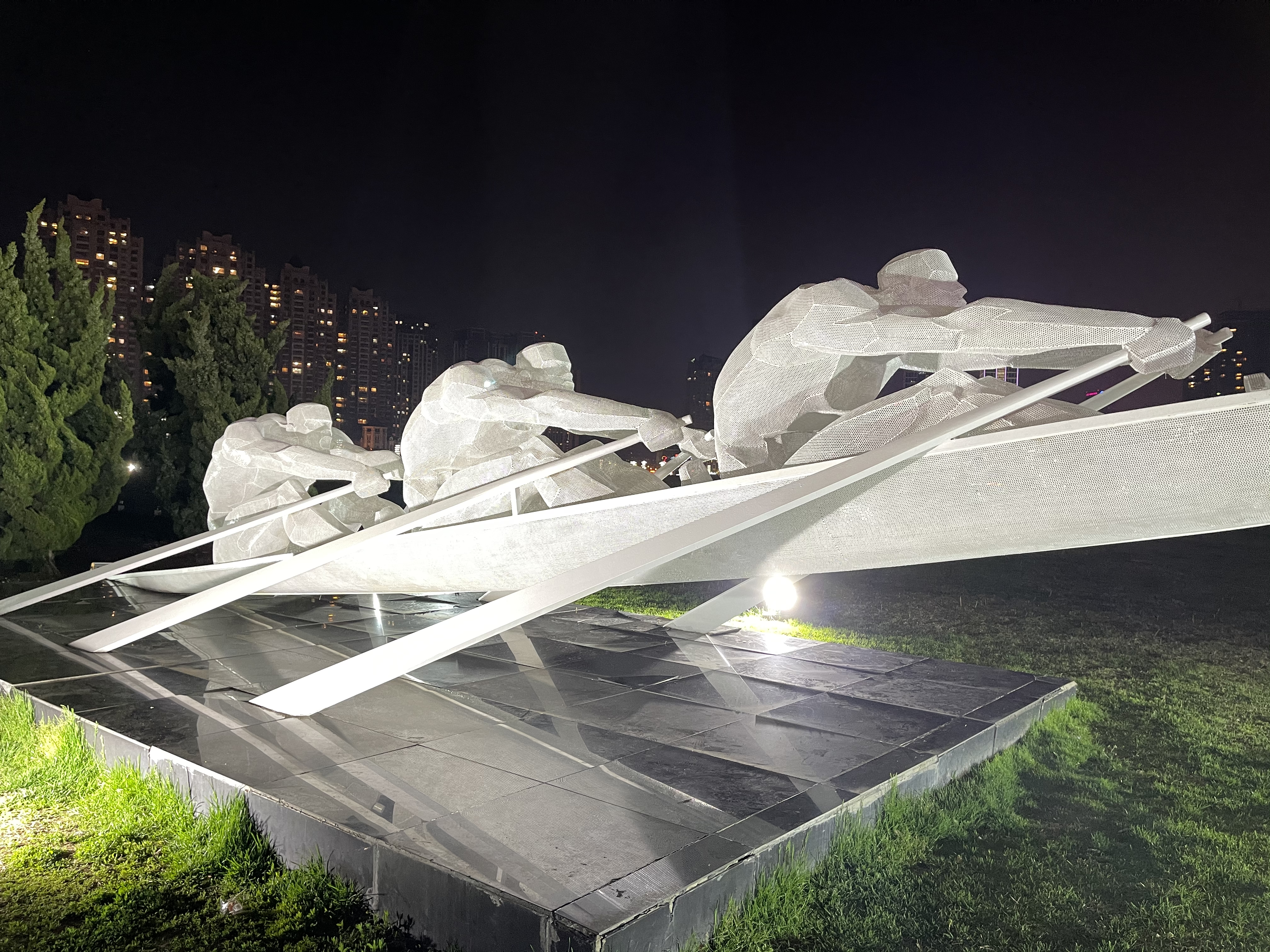
Modern Movement Sculpture for canoe and kayak

=== Modern movement sculptures ===
Around the outskirt of the square, there are 30 groups of modern movement sculptures, constructed for the 2008 Olympic Games in Beijing. The sculptures are made with white stainless steel mesh, and are hollow. The sculptures vividly show athletes' strong muscles and beautiful movement. The 30 groups of sculptures represent 30 kinds of sports: basketball, volleyball, American football, table tennis, badminton, softball, ice hockey, balance beam, rhythmic gymnastics, swimming, cycling, judo, shooting, windsurfing, canoe and kayak diving, high jump, long jump, pole vault, fencing, racewalking, javelin, figure skating, speed skating, skiing, diving, discus, long-distance running, hurdling, and equestrianism.

== Fountains ==
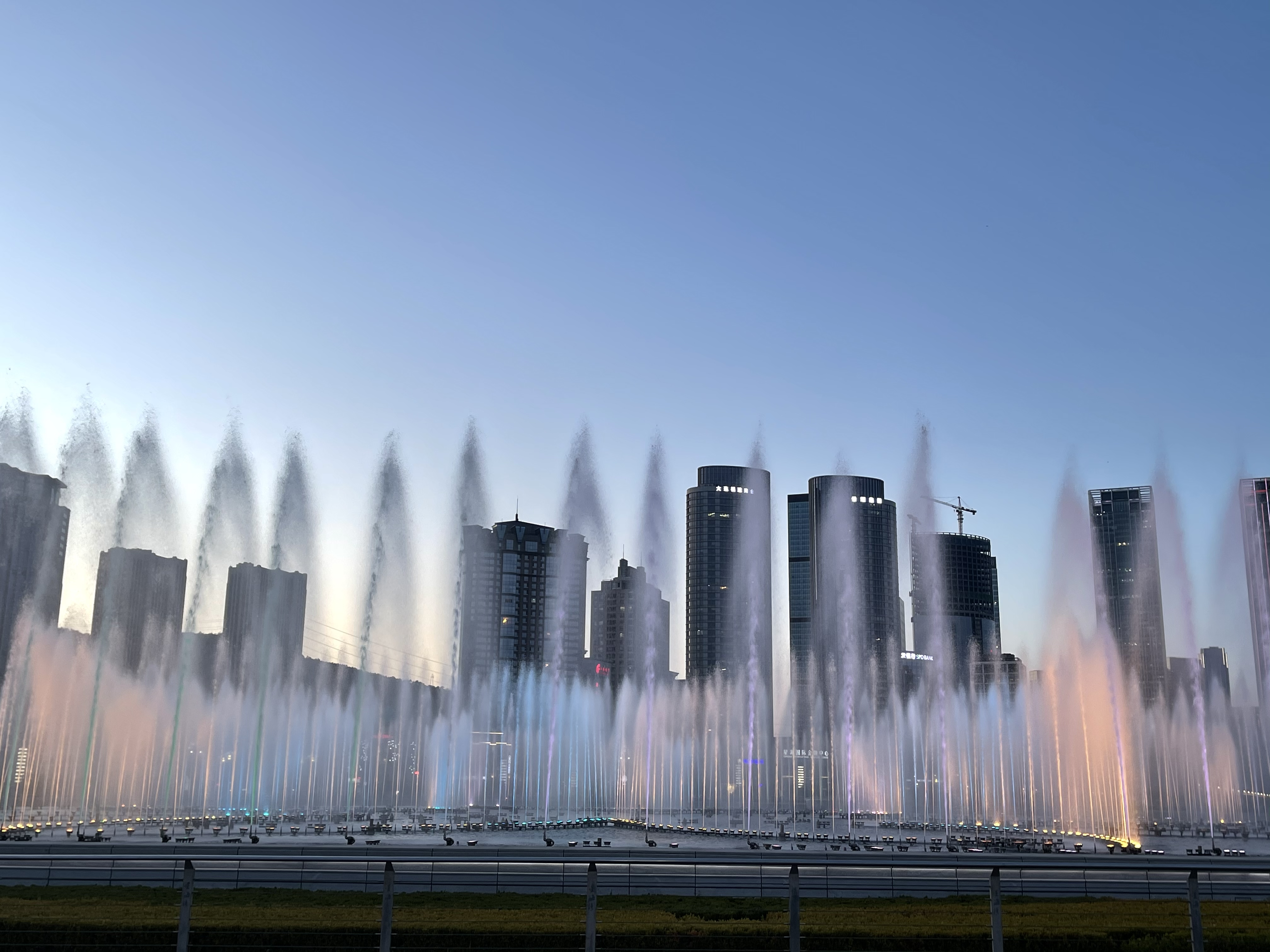
Musical Fountain

Xinghai Square's water landscape is distributed in the central star-shaped square, the Centennial City Sculpture and along the road in the middle of the square. The water landscape consists of the musical fountain and flowing water.

=== Musical fountain ===
The fountain has a diameter of 140 meters and a maximum spray height of 88 meters. It adopts 8 patented technologies and presents a performance of "sound, light, electricity, and fire".

=== Flowing water ===
The surrounding flowing water is arranged in a circular pattern. There are nine groups of musical fountains. The water landscape of the center has a total of fifty small colorful musical fountains.

== Events ==
=== Dalian International Walking Conference ===
Since the first Dalian International Walking Conference was successfully held in 2003, the third weekend in May has become a major festival for hiking enthusiasts and citizens in Dalian to go hiking. In 2008, the International Marching League organized more than 600 Dutch hiking enthusiasts to Dalian to participate in the Sino-Dutch Friendship Hiking Conference. Dutch hikers and Dalian hikers walked together on Xinghai Square and Binhai Road.

=== China International Beer Festival ===
In the midsummer of 1999, the first China International Beer Festival was held in the Olympic Sports Center in Beijing. In 2002, it moved to Dalian, and opened a new chapter in Xinghai Square.

== Service facilities ==
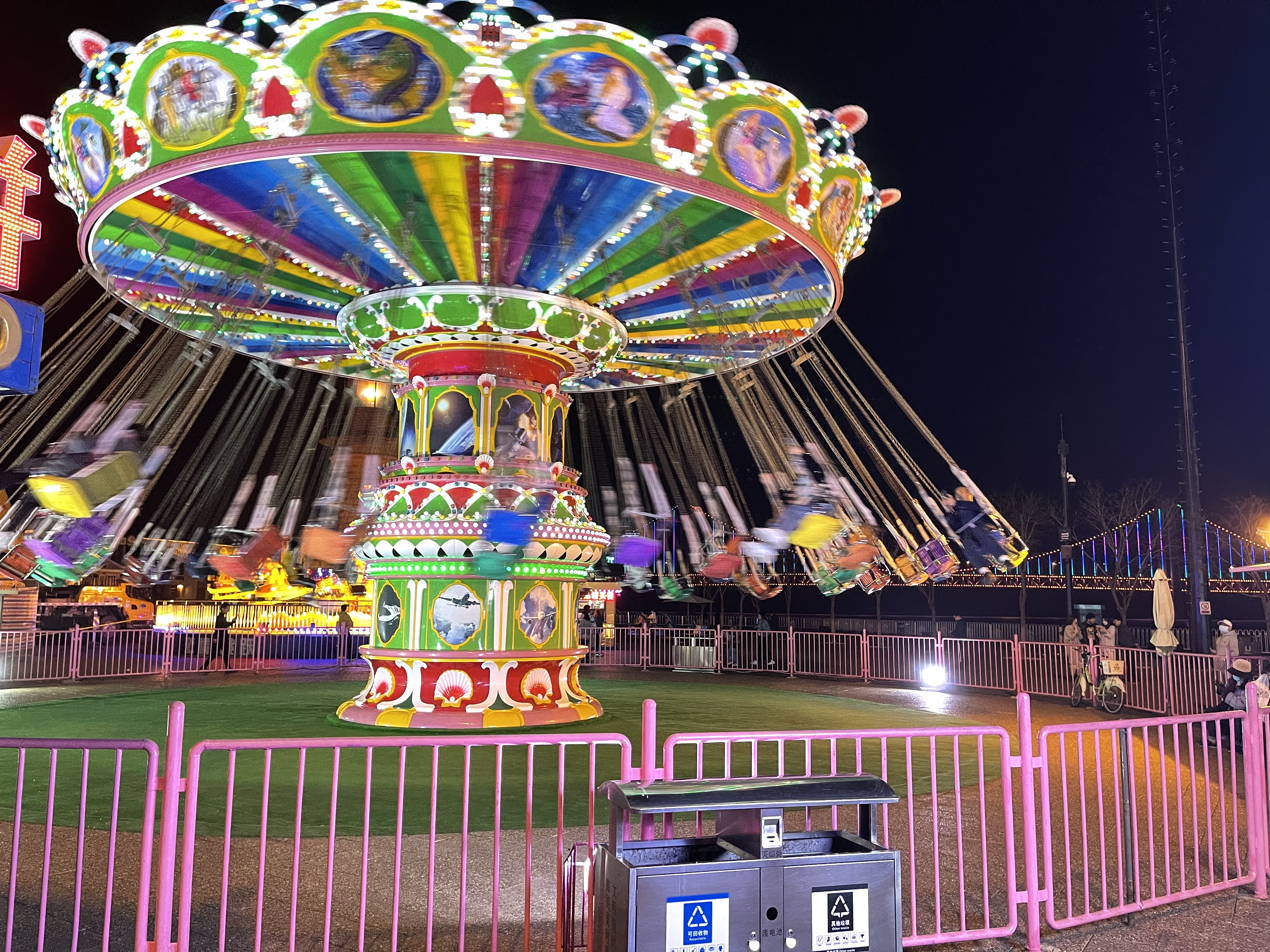
An amusement ride

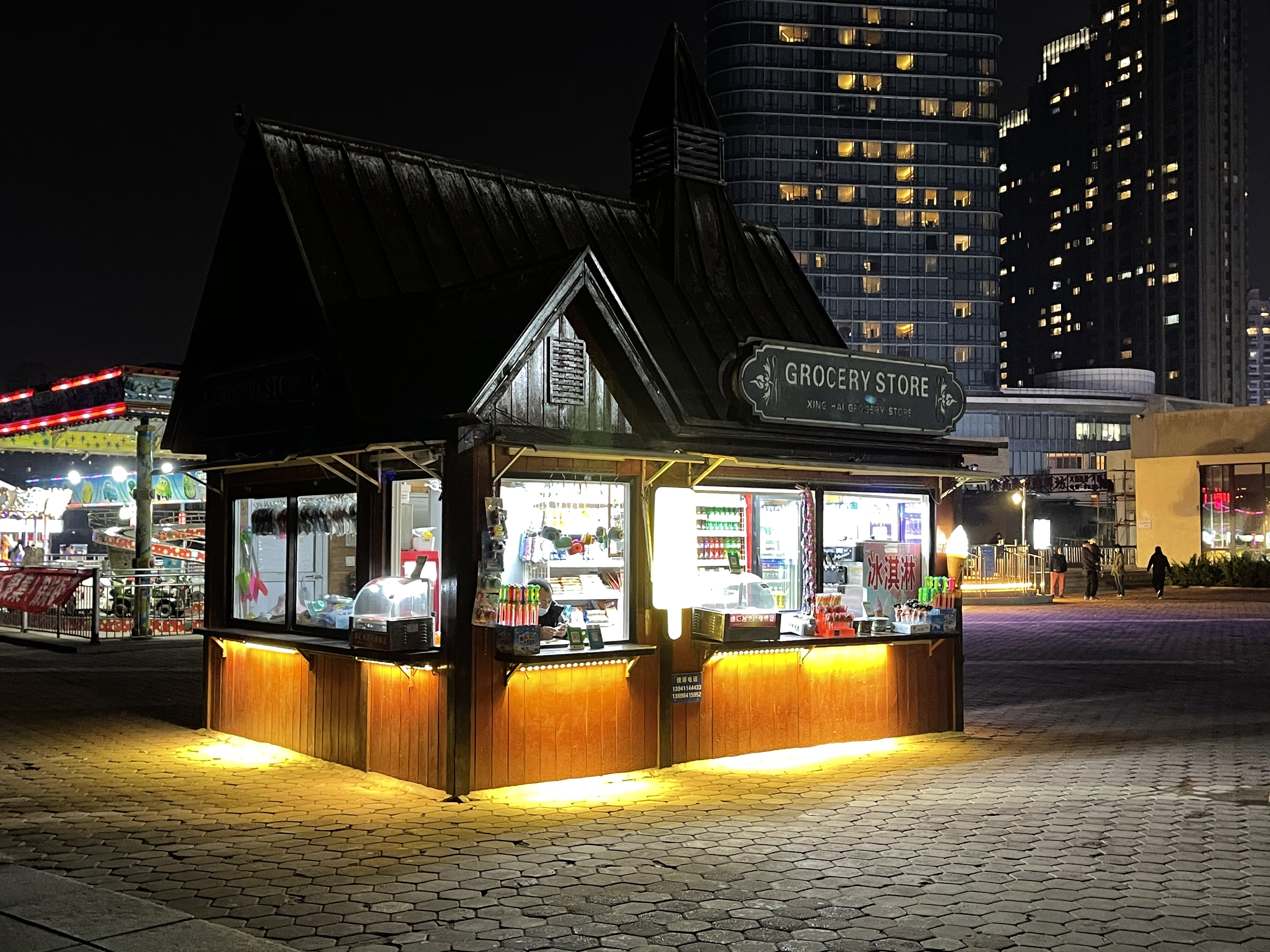
A kiosk

Xinghai Square provides citizens and visitors many services and facilities:

- Benches
- Toilets
- Kiosks
- Vending machines
- Amusement rides
- Obstacle facilities
- Shared charging point

== Transportation ==
=== Bus ===
Bus lines
line 16	line 18	line 22	line 901
line 23	line 28	line 37	
line 49	line 202	line 406	
line 531	line 542	line 808	

=== Metro ===
Xinghai Square station on Line 1 connects to the square, and it has three exits: A1, A2, and C.

== Gallery ==
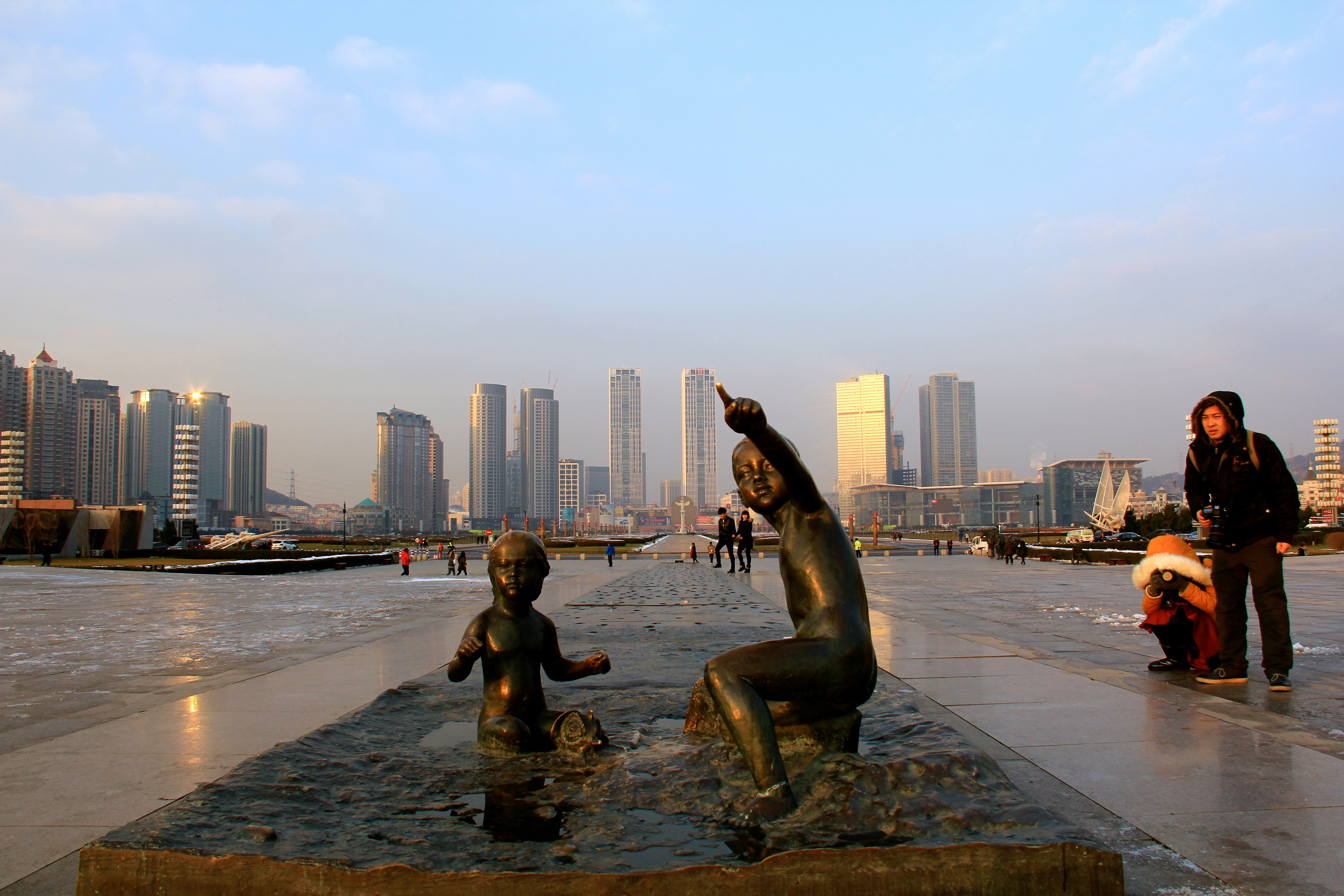
Xinghai Square

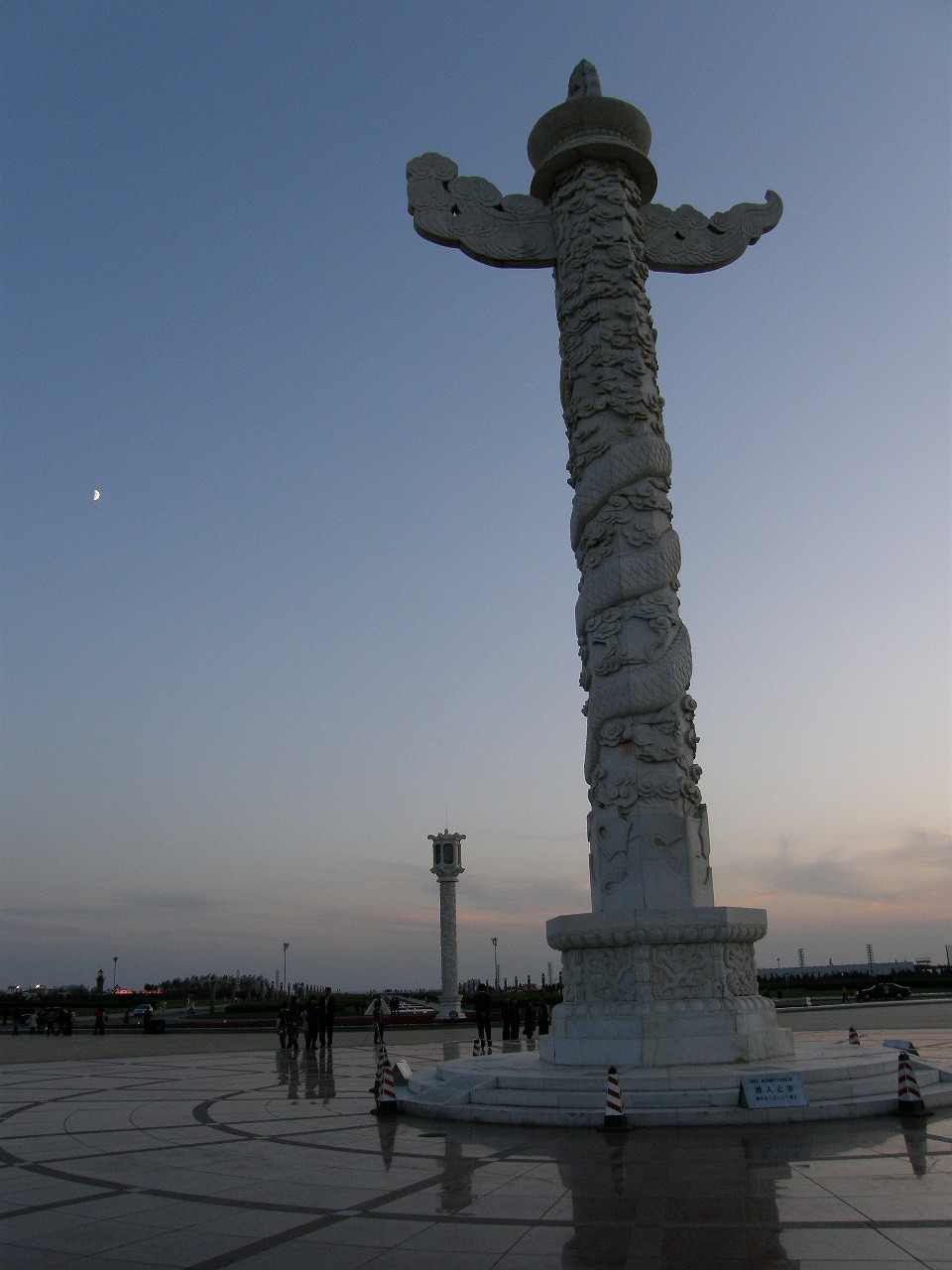
Huabiao in the center of square (now the location of musical fountain)

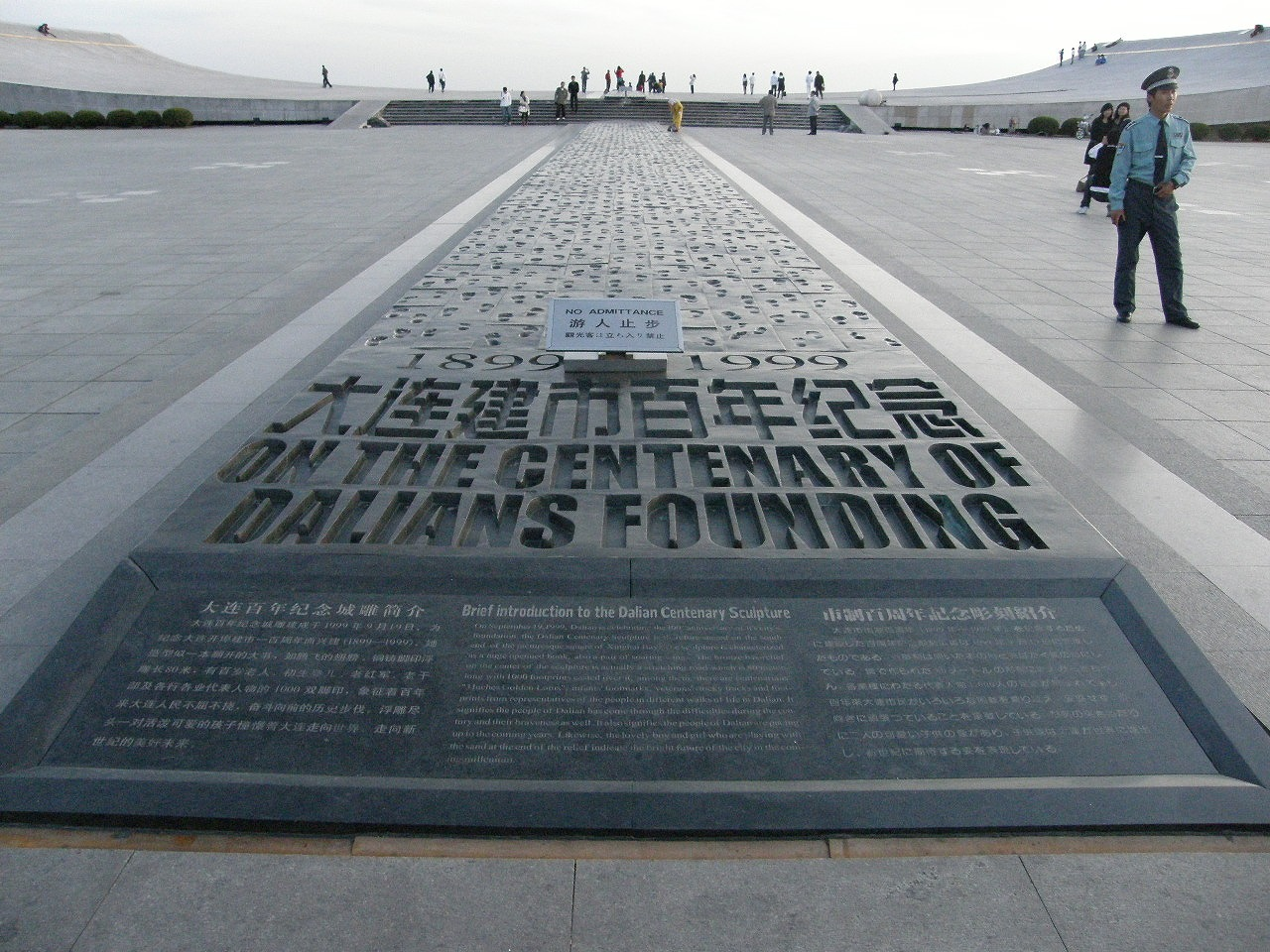
Sculpture complex of 1000 footprints and an opened book

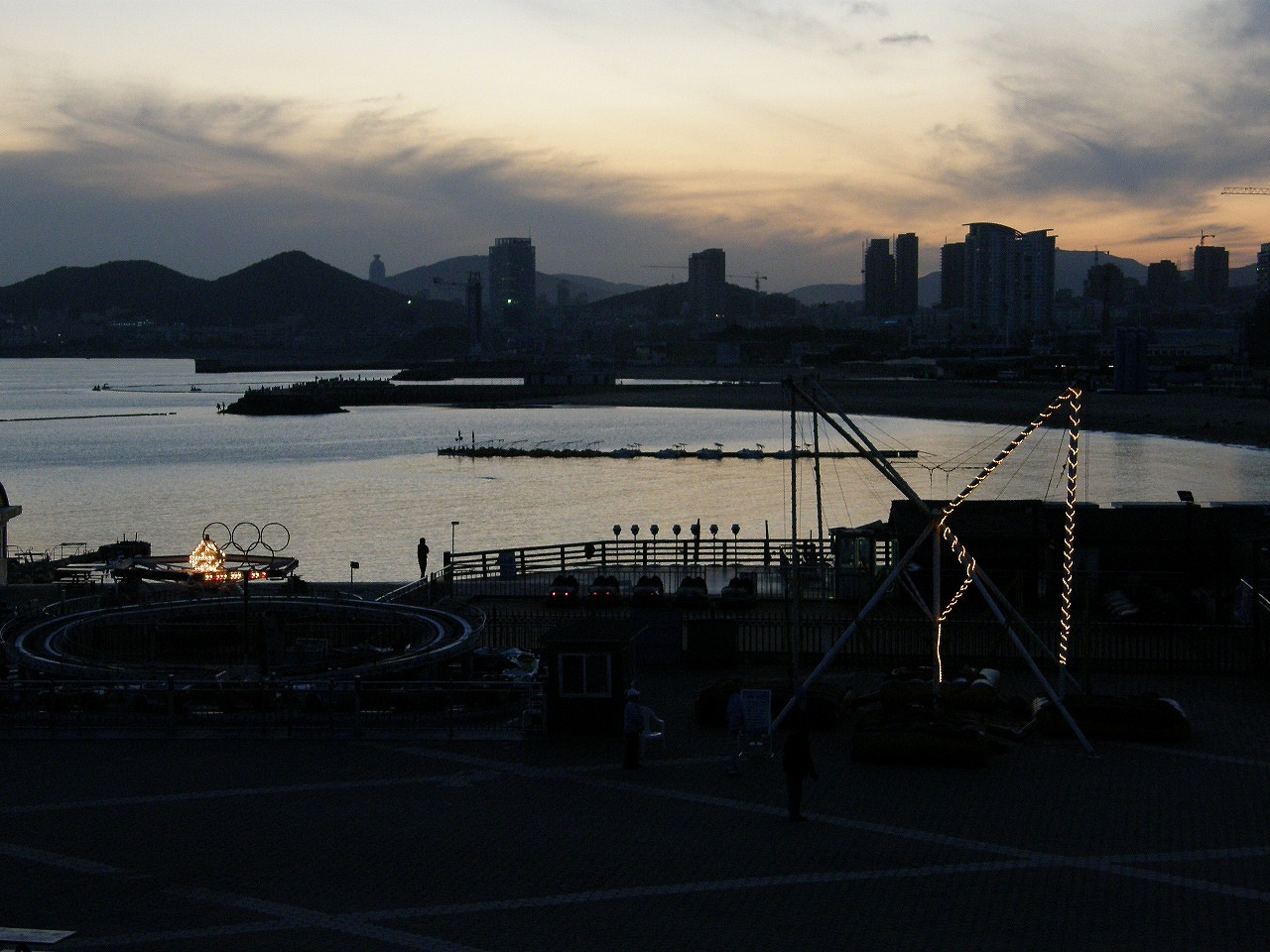
Xinghai Square at night

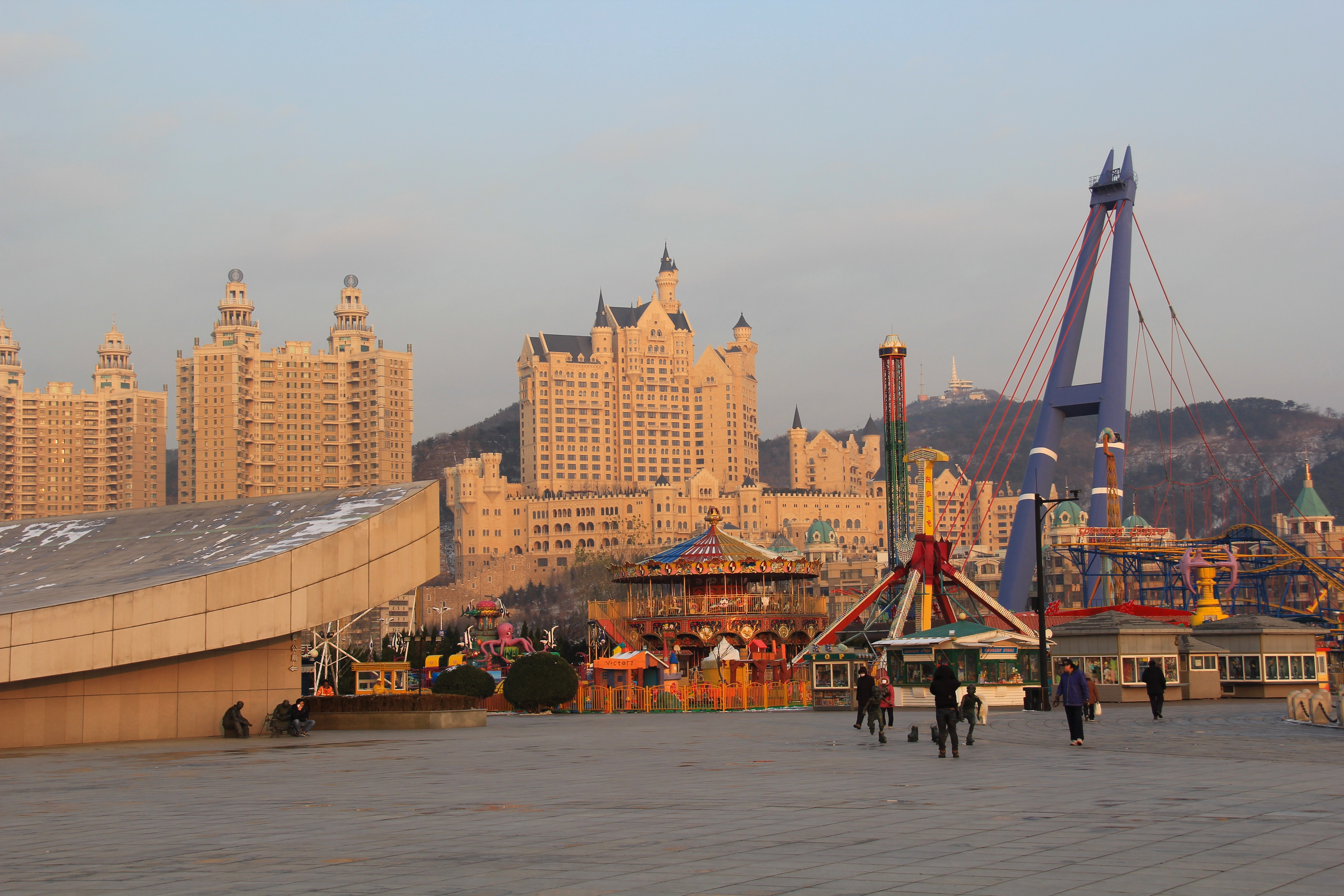
Xinghai Square amusement park with the Castle Hotel in the background

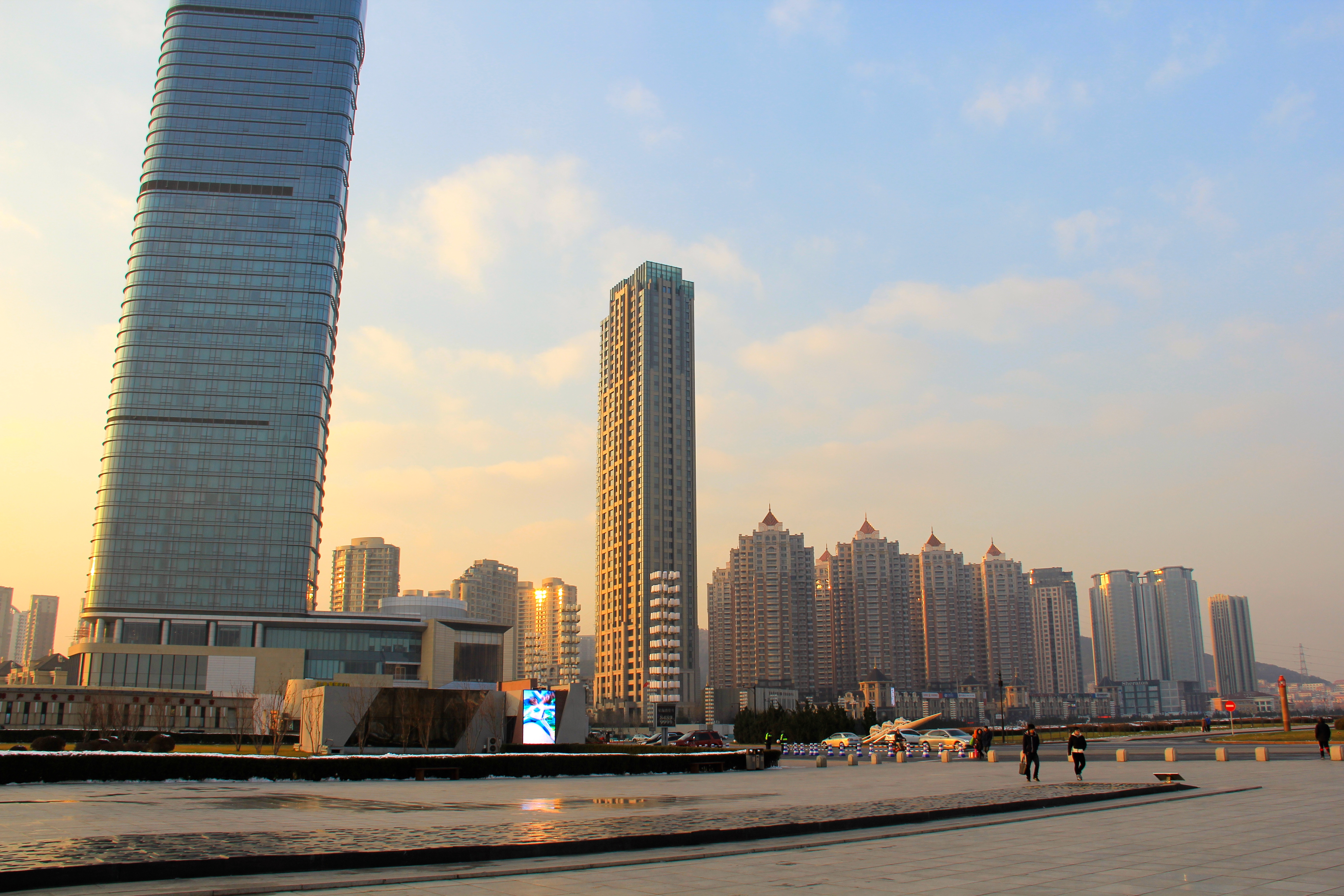
Grand Hyatt Dalian (left) and apartments at Xinghai Square

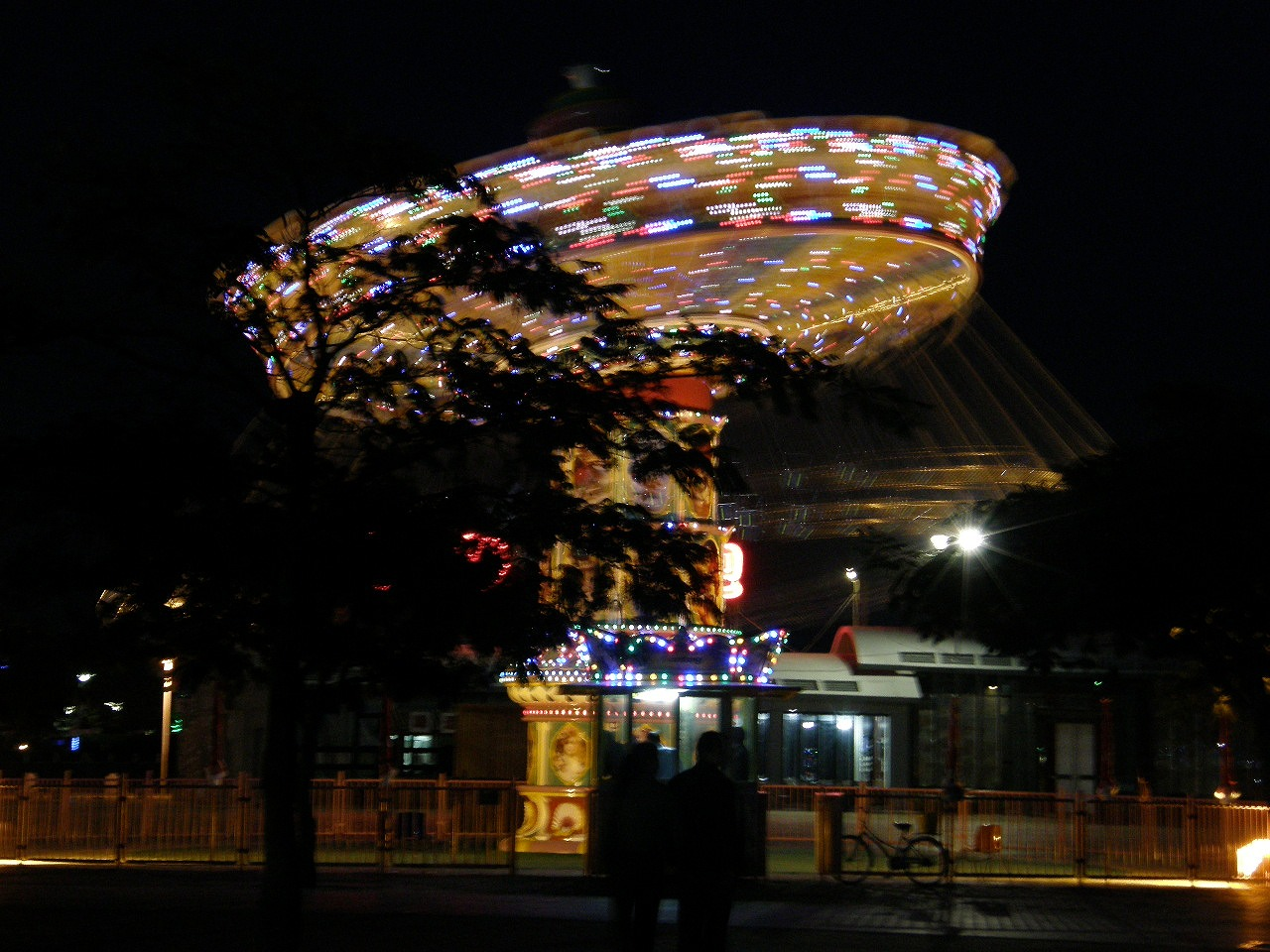
Xinghai Square Amusement Park

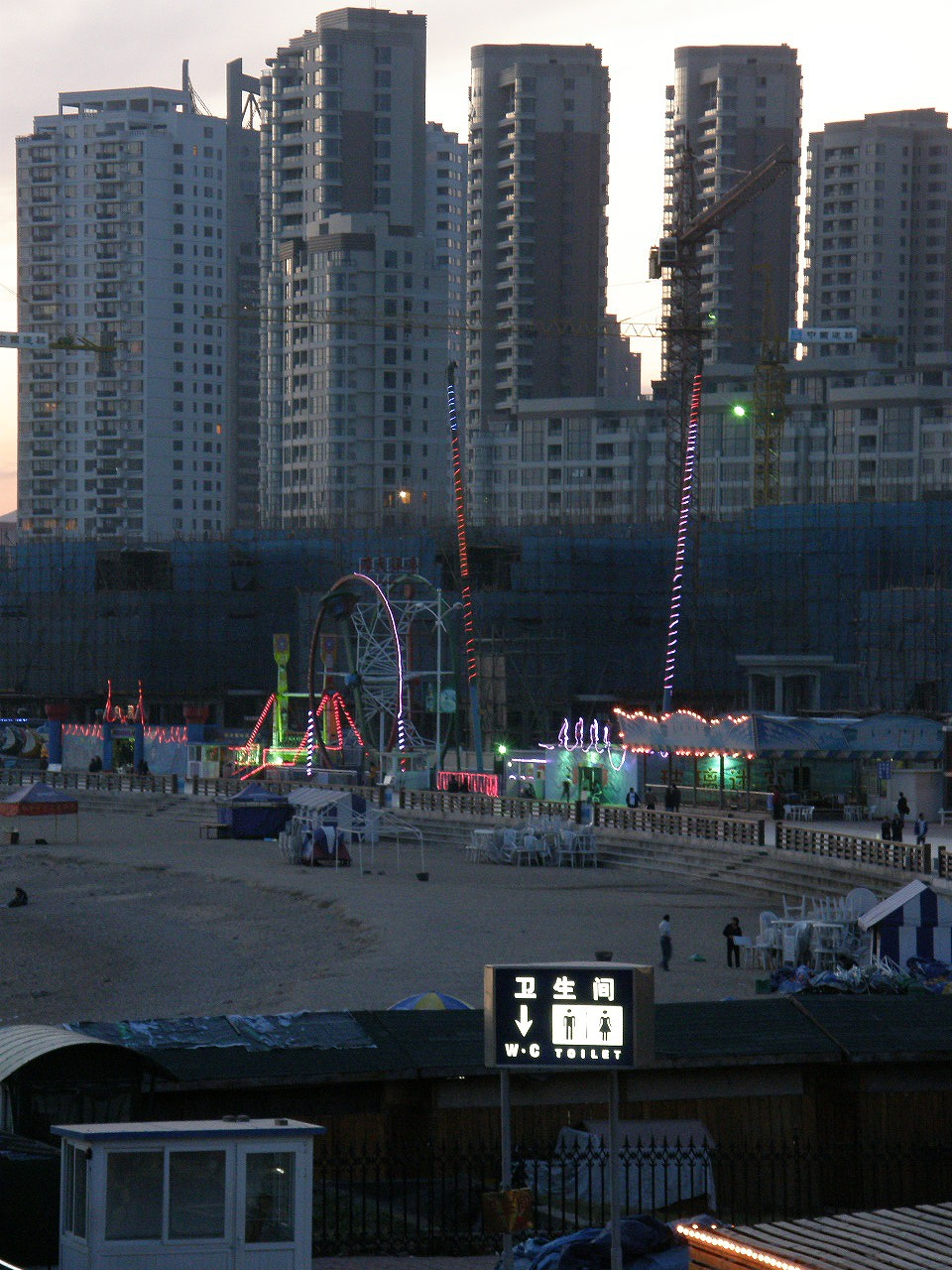
Outskirts of Xinghai Square

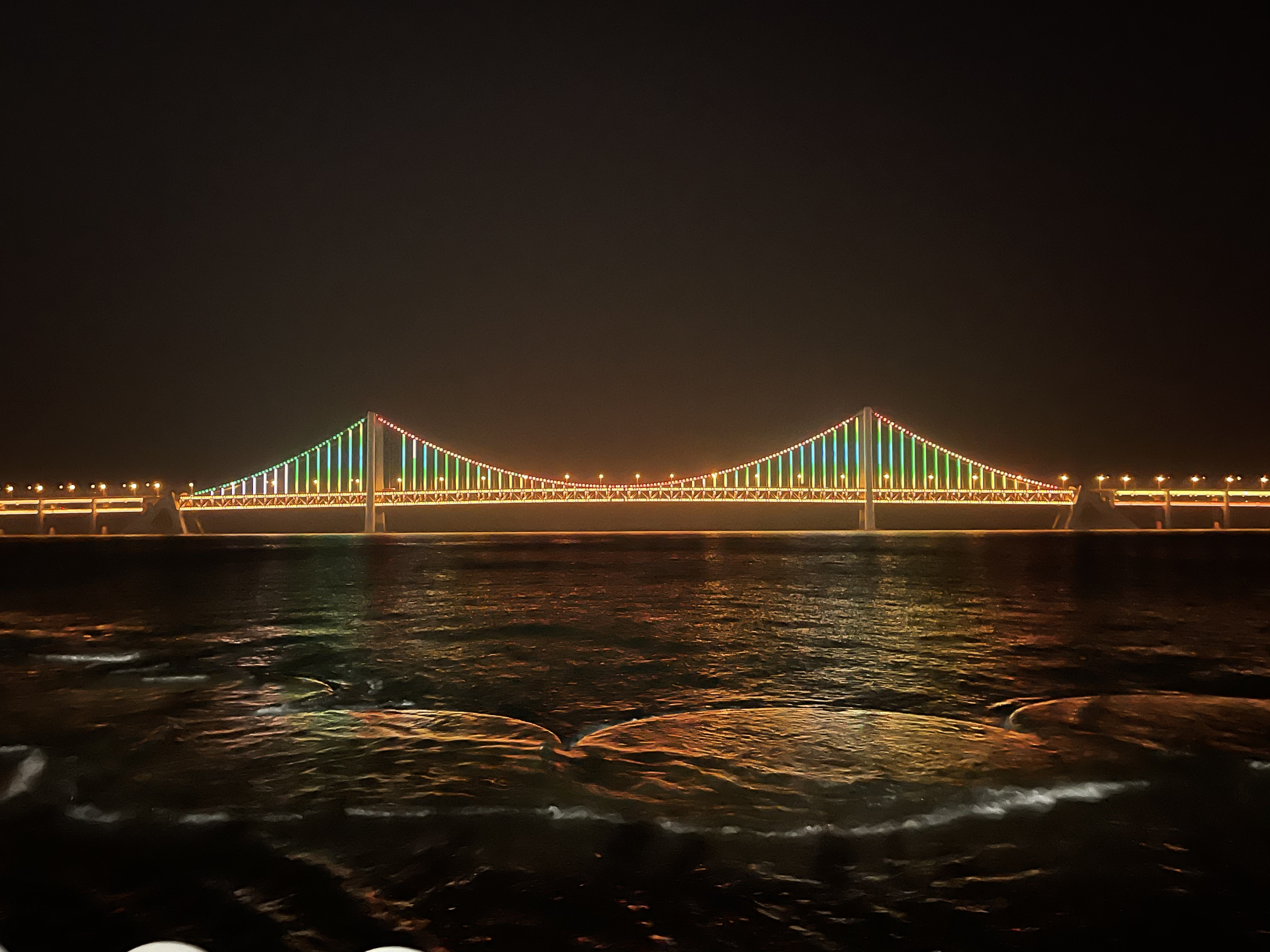
Xinghai Bay Bridge

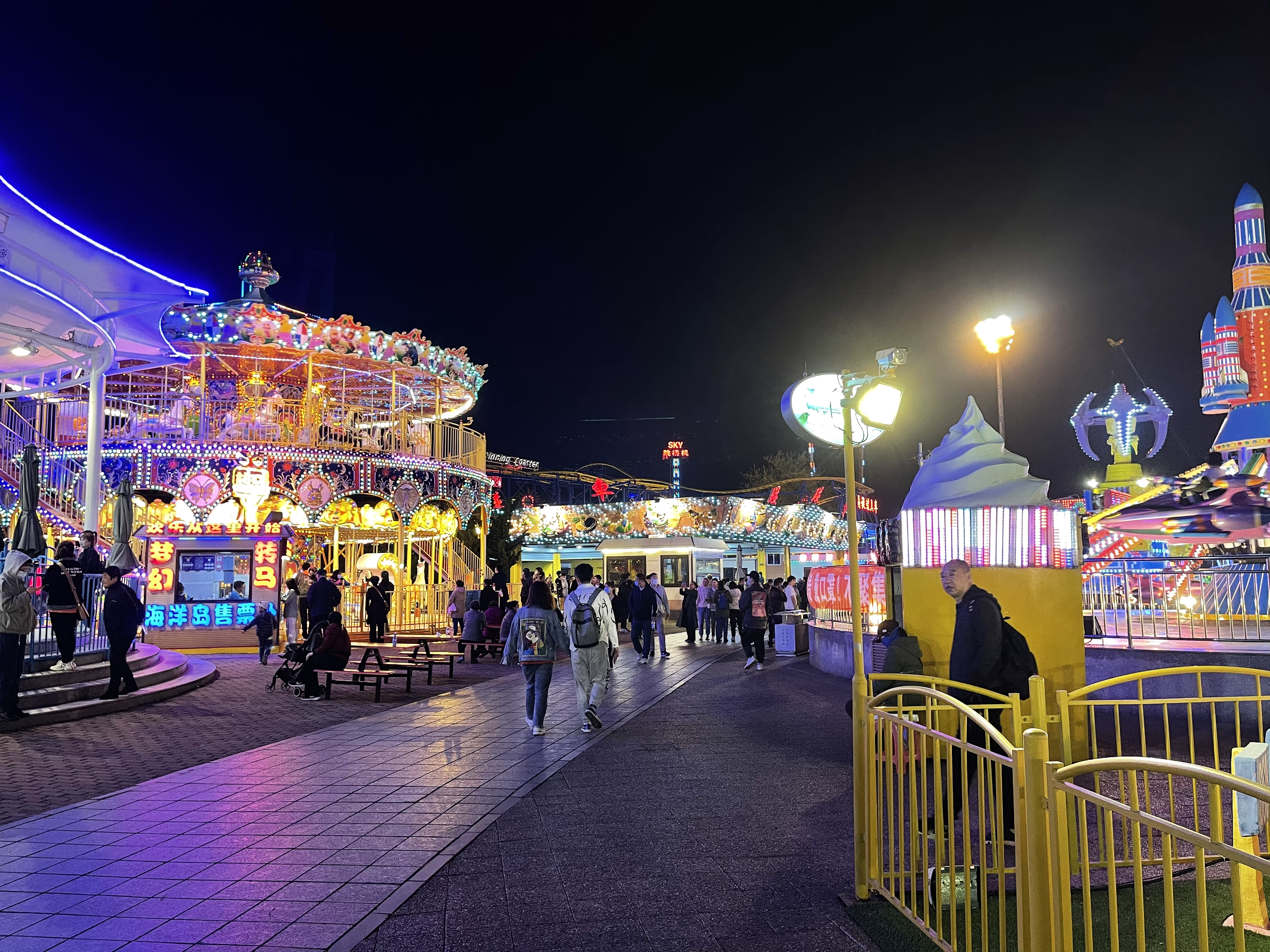
Amusement rides in Xinghai Square

== See also ==
- Xinghai Park
