= Victory Square (Dalian) =

Square in Dalian, China

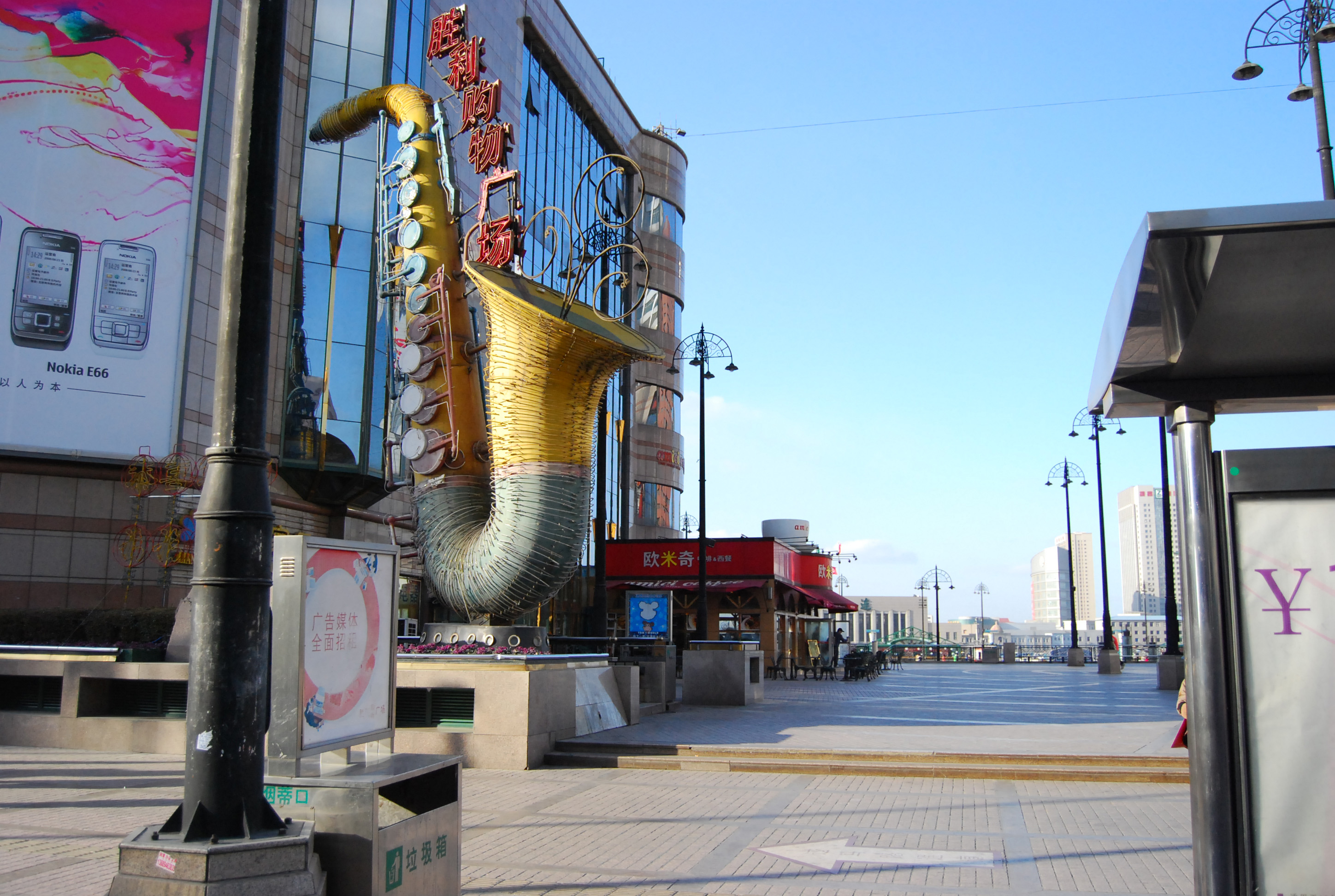
Victory Square, viewed from Zhongshan Road, with Dalian railway station in the background

Victory Square (Chinese: 胜利广场) or Victory Plaza is the central plaza in the Qingniwaqiao area, Zhongshan District, Dalian, Liaoning, China. It is located immediately south of the south exit plaza of Dalian railway station and is bounded by Changjiang Road on the south side, Zhongshan Road on the south, Jiefang Road on the east, and Qingniwa Road on the west.

Dalian Victory Square has on the ground only a coffeeshop and sevel other two- to six-story buildings, especially on the Zhongshan Road side, but is noted for its three-story underground shopping area. There are no monuments of "victory" placed here on the square or on Victory Road (Chinese: 胜利路), one of the city's large boulevards.

The square was proposed by Ts'ai Ch'en Nan (Cai Chennan, zh:蔡辰男) of Taiwan when he toured here in 1992, and was constructed from the following year to 1998, when it was opened.

== See also ==
- Qingniwaqiao
- Victory Square (disambiguation)
