= Xinghai Park =

Beach park in Dalian, China

Coordinates: 38.8784189°N 121.5681412°E

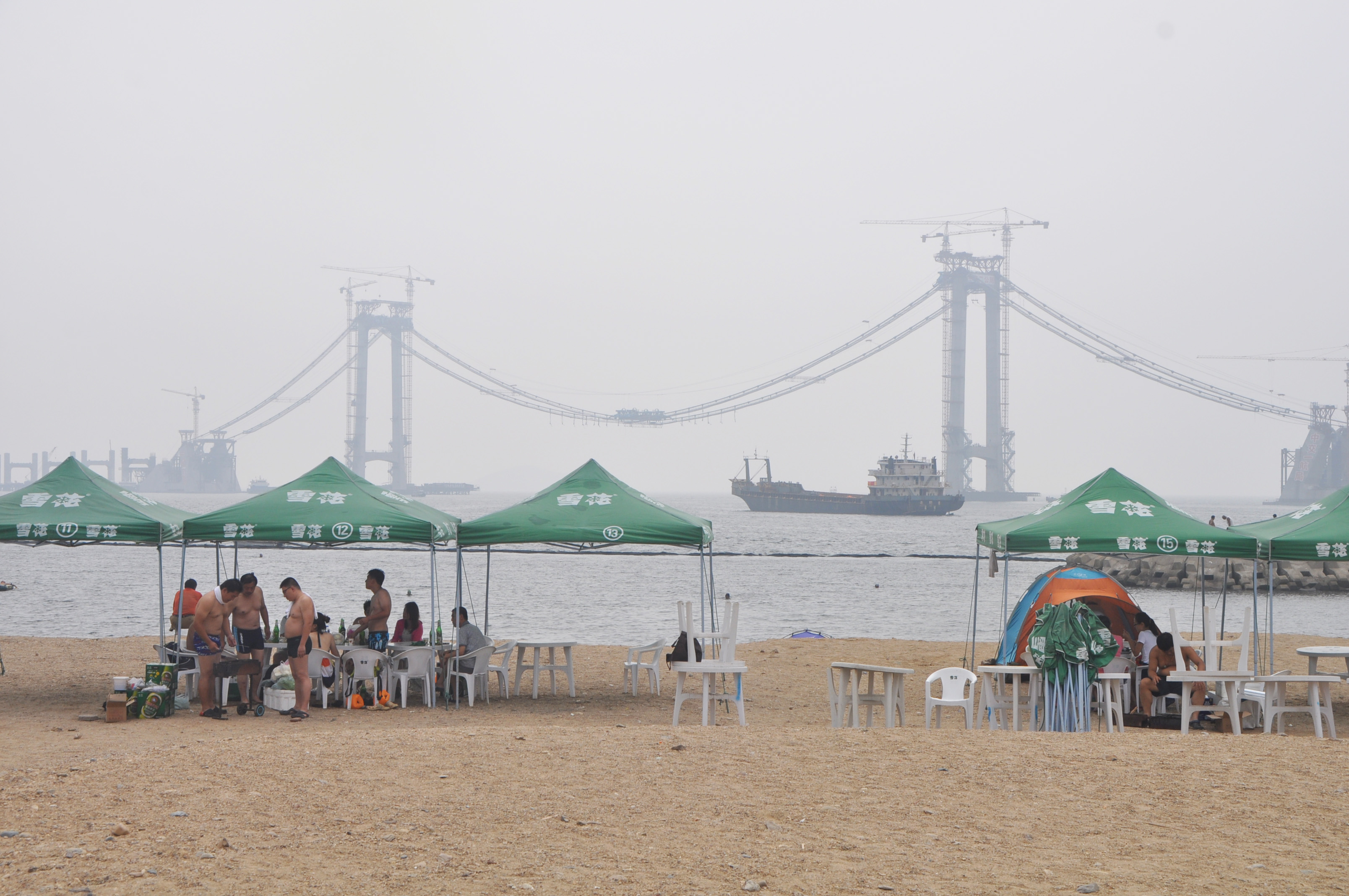
On the beach of Xinghai Park, with the Xinghai Bay Bridge under construction, in the background

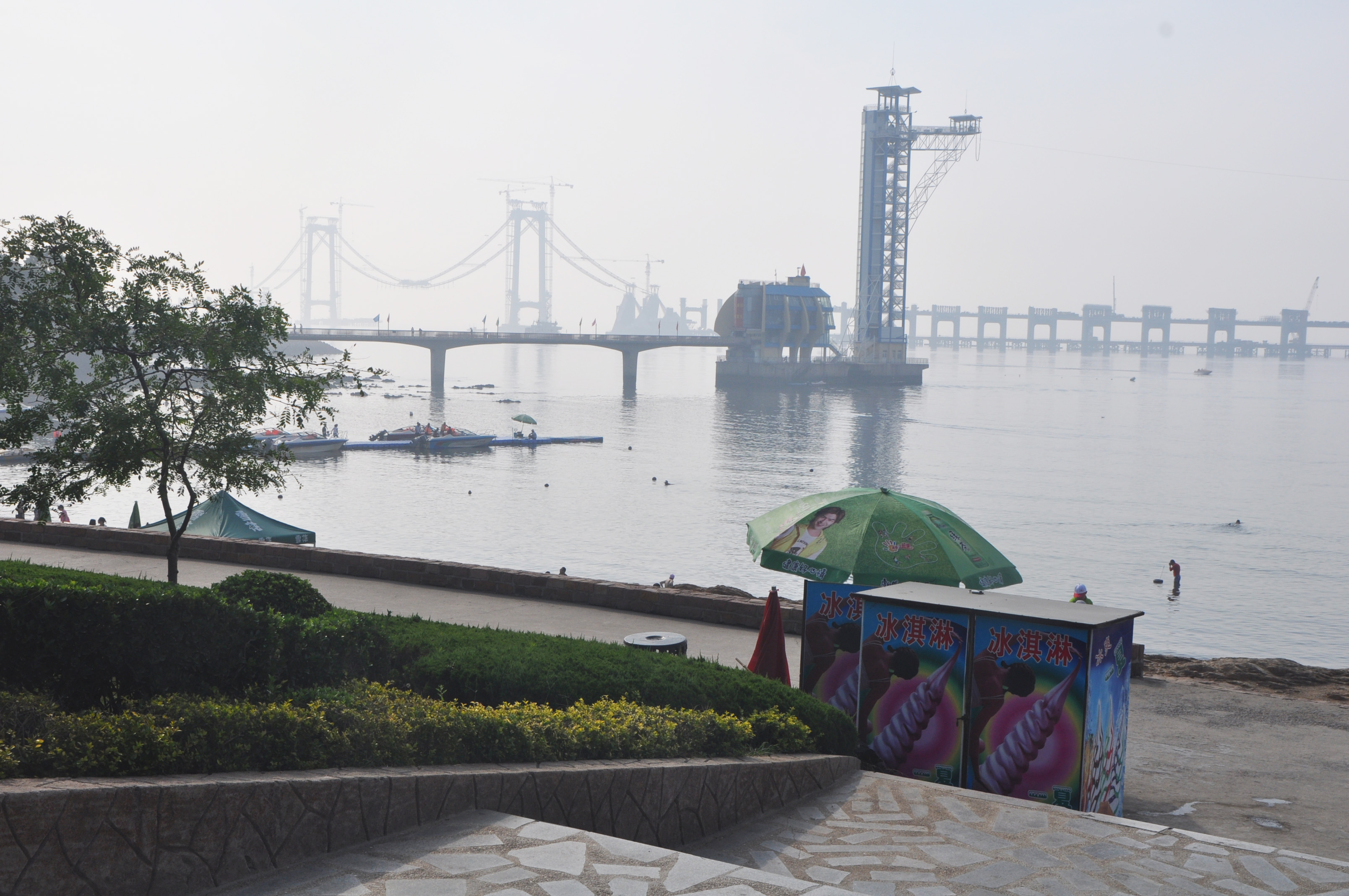
Xinghai Park and its Bungee jumping facility

Xinghai Park (Chinese: 星海公园) is a beach park on the southern coast of Dalian, Liaoning Province, China.

== Description ==
Xinghai Park was originally established by the South Manchuria Railway Company in 1909, as "Hoshi-ga-Ura" (Japanese: 星ヶ浦, meaning "Star Beach"). It was an integrated resort with a bathing beach, a golf course, and the Hoshi-ga-ura Yamato Hotel, and was chosen as one of the Eight Scenic Spots of Lüshun-Dalian.

In 1945, the park's name was changed to Xinghai Park. It now covers an area of 150,000 square meters, has a beach of 800 meters long, and is one of the four major beaches in Dalian. The sea has a 55 meters high bungee jumping facility from New Zealand. The Xinghai Bay Bridge can be seen offshore. There is also a coastal walkway to Xinghai Square.

To the east of Xinghai Park, is also an oceanarium, called the Sunasia Ocean World.

The park is open free of charge from 7:30 to 17:30 (longer hours in the summer).

== Transportation ==
Xinghai Beach bus stop on Zhongshan Road, part of Lushun South Road, which connects Lüshun with Dalian downtown. On Dalian Metro's Line 1, get off at Second Hospital of Dalian Medical University Station, and walk west for 500 meters.

== See also ==
- Xinghai Square
- Xinghai Bay Bridge
