= Nanshahekou Subdistrict =

Nanshahekou 南沙河口街道
- Subdistrict
- Country: China
- Province: Liaoning
- Prefecture: Dalian
- District: Shahekou

Area
  - Total: 9.1 km^{2} (3.5 sq mi)

Population
  - Total: 78,323
  - Density: 8,600/km^{2} (22,000/sq mi)
- Time zone: UTC+8 (China Standard Time)
- Division code: 210204009000

Nanshahekou Subdistrict is a township-level division of the southwest of the Shahekou District of Dalian, Liaoning, China.

== Administration ==
There are 12 communities within the subdistrict.

Communities:

- Hanyang Community (汉阳社区)
- Houshan Community (后山社区)
- Lanting Community (兰亭社区)
- Nanshahekou Community (南沙河口社区)
- Taikuo Community (台扩社区)
- Yuanzhongyuan Community (园中园社区)
- Shuifushanzhu Community (水芙山竹社区)
- Taoshan Community (桃山社区)
- Haijian Community (海建社区)
- Xinghairenjia Community (星海人家社区)
- Xingfuejia Community (幸福e家社区)
- Dongfang Community (东方社区)

== See also ==
- List of township-level divisions of Liaoning
- Shahekou
