= Victoria Square =

Victoria Square may refer to:

== Squares and plazas ==
=== Australia ===
- Victoria Square, Adelaide, South Australia
- Victoria Square, Perth, Western Australia

=== Canada ===
- Victoria Memorial Square, Toronto, Canada
- Victoria Square, Montreal, Quebec, Canada
- Victoria Square, Toronto, a 19th-century planned civic space in front of Old City Hall

=== United Kingdom ===
- Queen Victoria Square, Kingston upon Hull, England
- Victoria Square, Belfast, Northern Ireland
  - Victoria Square Shopping Centre
- Victoria Square, Birmingham, England
- Victoria Square, London, England
- Victoria Square, Woking, England

=== Other places ===
- Victoria Square, Christchurch, New Zealand
- Viktoria Square, Athens, Greece

== Populated places ==
- Victoria Square, Manchester, England
- Victoria Square, Ontario, Canada

== Fiction ==
- Victoria Square, Walford, in the British TV series EastEnders

== See also ==
- List of places named after Queen Victoria
- Victory Square (disambiguation)
