= Dashang Group =

Retail company based in Dalian

- Type: Public
- Traded as: SSE: 600694
- Industry: Retail
- Founded: 1995
- Headquarters: Dalian, Liaoning, China
- Number of locations: 280 (2014)
- Area served: China
- Key people: Niu Gang (Chairman)
- Products: department store; supermarket; five-star hotel; real estate; cinema; eCommerce
- Revenue: ▲CN¥170 billion (2014)
- Number of employees: 230,000 (2014)
- Subsidiaries: MYKAL; New Mart; Kingson; NTS; Tiangou eCommerce
- Website: www.dsjt.com

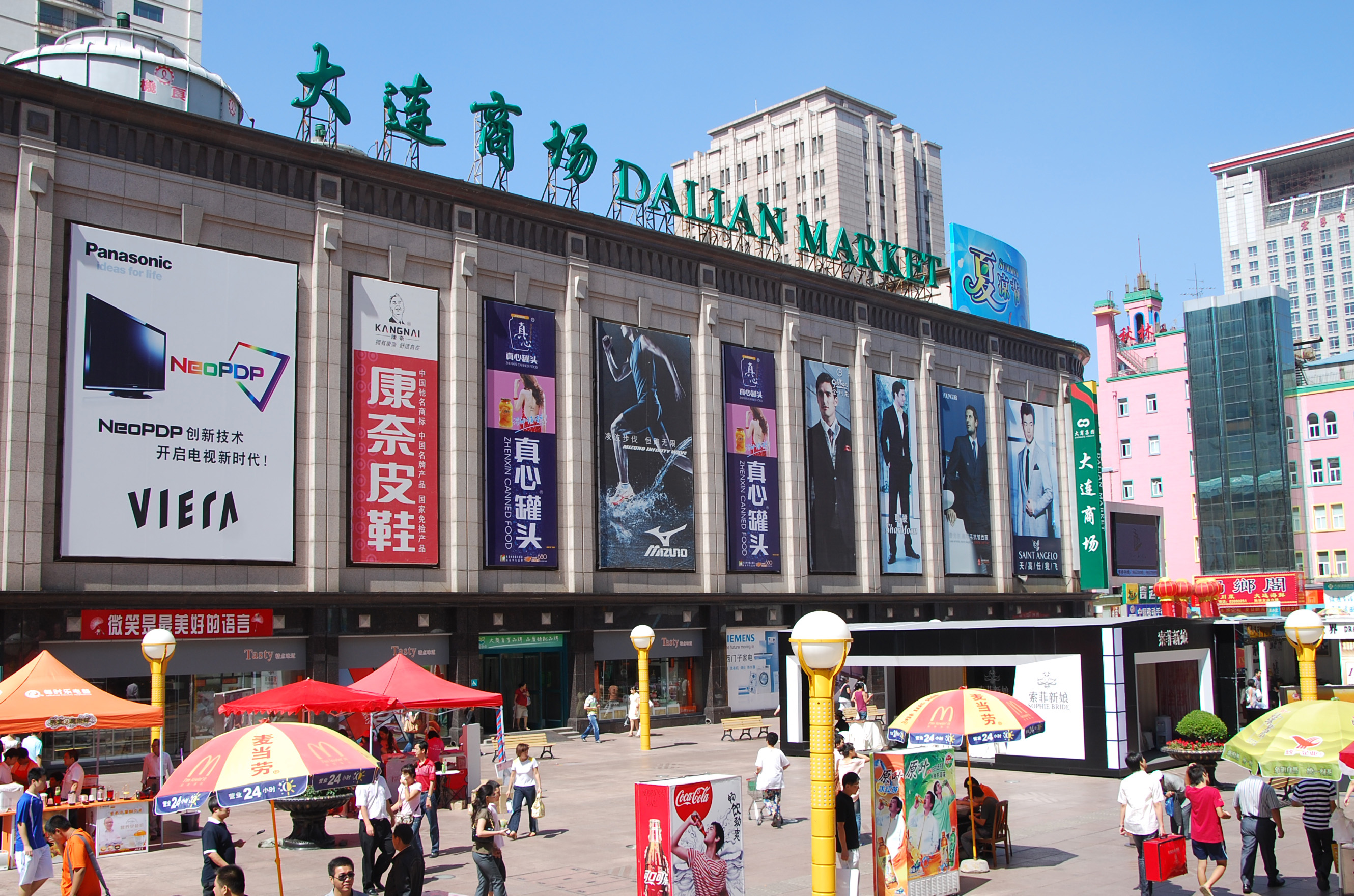
Dalian Market, Dashang Group's Flagship Store, in Qingniwaqiao, Dalian, Liaoning, China

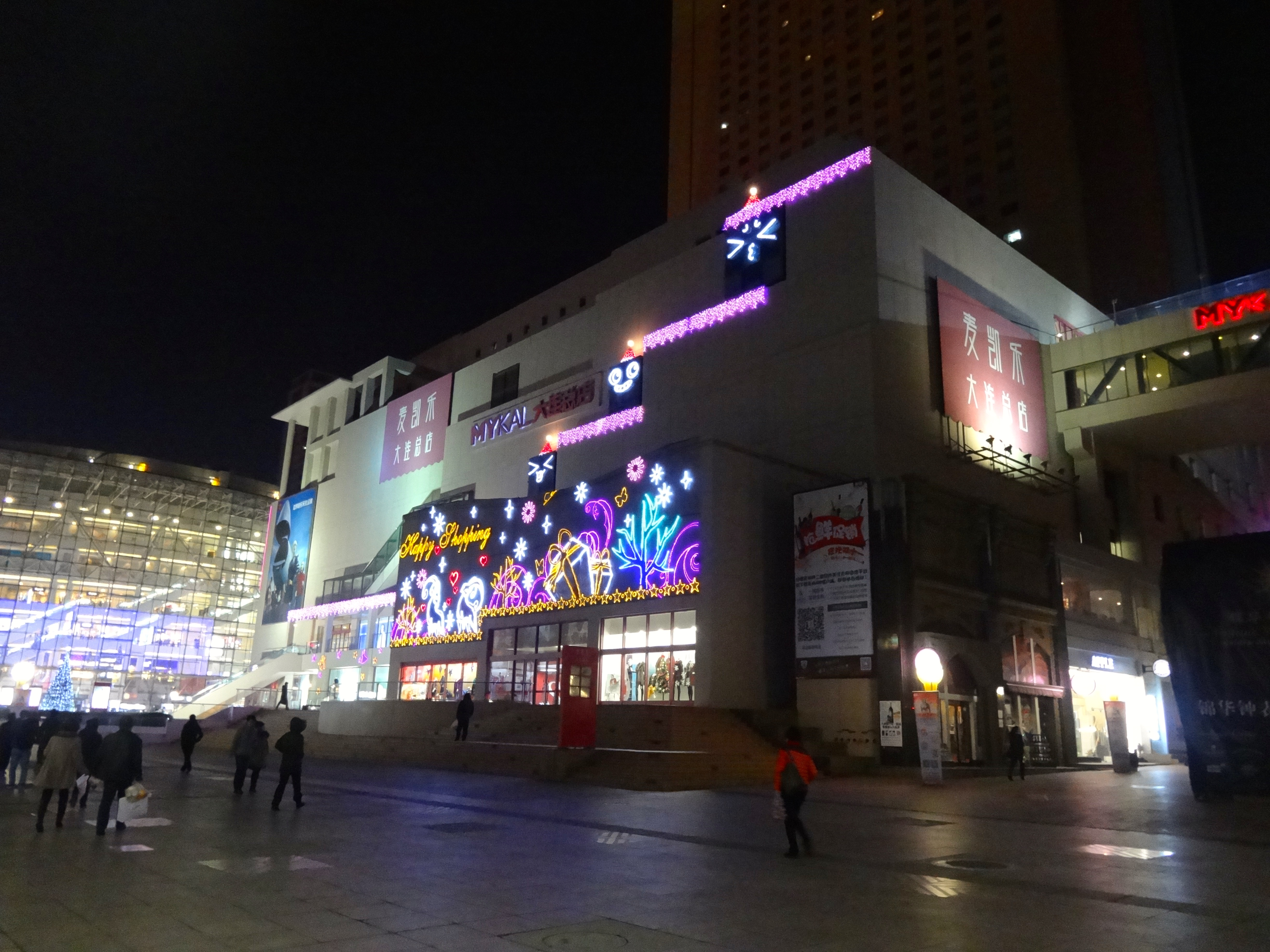
MYKAL Flagship Store in Dalian

Dashang Group (Chinese: 大商集团), headquartered in Dalian, Liaoning Province, China, operates department stores, Xinmate (New Mart) supermarkets and other retail business. It is the largest retailer in Northeast China.

== General ==
Dashang Group with its headquarters in Dalian, Liaoning Province, operates Dalian Market (Chinese: 大连商场) in central Dalian, that includes Xinmate (Chinese: 新玛特, New Mart) department store & super market, Jiajia Square (for refurbishing materials), Dalian MYKAL (Dalian MYCAL formerly), Dashang Qiulin Women's Store and Dashang Men's Store.

Dashang Group operates 150 retail stores in Dalian, has retail stores in 150 cities in eleven provinces, employs 170,000 people, and had a gross revenue of 62,500,000,000 yuan. It is the largest retailer in Northeast China. In 2005, it acquired Harbin No. 1 Department Store in Harbin, Heilongjiang Province.

Dashang Group is listed in Shanghai Stock Exchange (600694).

== See also ==
- Dalian
