= Xinghaiwan Subdistrict =

Xinghaiwan 星海湾街道
- Subdistrict
- Country: China
- Province: Liaoning
- Prefecture: Dalian
- District: Shahekou

Area
  - Total: 10.36 km^{2} (4.00 sq mi)

Population
  - Total: 108,800
  - Density: 10,500/km^{2} (27,200/sq mi)
- Time zone: UTC+8 (China Standard Time)
- Division code: 210204017000

Xinghaiwan Subdistrict is a township-level division of the south of the Shahekou District of Dalian, Liaoning, China.

== Administration ==
There are 17 communities within the subdistrict.

Communities:

- Haizhou Community (海州社区)
- Longjiang Road Community (龙江路社区)
- Xinghai Park Community (星海公园社区)
- Lianshan Community (连山社区)
- Huawusuo Community (化物所社区)
- Xingnan Community (星南社区)
- Xinghai Square Community (星海广场社区)
- Xingbei Community (星北社区)
- New Hope Community (新希望社区)
- Xingwen Community (星文社区)
- Jiefang Community (解放社区)
- Yuhua Community (玉华社区)
- Zhongshan Road Community (中山路社区)
- Jixian Community (集贤社区)
- Xinhua Community (新华社区)
- Lianhuashan Community (莲花山社区)
- Bihai Community (碧海社区)

== See also ==
- List of township-level divisions of Liaoning
- Shahekou
