= Taching (disambiguation) =

Taching is the former romanization of Daqing, China.

Taching may also refer to:

- Taching am See, a town in Bavaria, Germany.
- Tachinger See or Lake Taching, a large lake in the district of Traunstein, Upper Bavaria, Germany.

== See also ==
- Daqing (disambiguation)
- Da-Qing Bank
