= Xi'an Road Commercial Zone =

Area of Dalian, China

Xi'an Road Commercial Zone (in Chinese: 西安路商业区) is the second busiest commercial area, after Qingniwaqiao, in Dalian City, Liaoning Province, China.

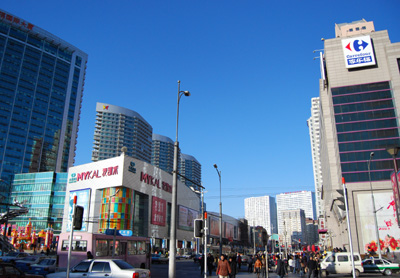
Xi'an Road Commercial Zone, Dalian, China

== West of downtown Dalian ==
Located a few kilometers west of Qingniwaqiao in downtown Dalian, Xi'an Road Commercial Zone along Xi'an Road (Chinese: 西安路), from Jiefang Square (Chinese: 解放广场) in the south to Shahekou Railway Station (Chinese: 沙河口火车站) in the north, is the second busiest commercial area, after Qingniwaqiao, in Dalian City, Liaoning Province, China.

This is a relatively new commercial area, which started to be developed approximately from 2001.

=== Commercial center ===
- Fujia Xintiandi (Chinese: 福佳新天地)
  - Wal-Mart
- Parkson
- Changxing Market (Chinese: 长兴市场)
- Suning Appliance
- GOME Electrical Appliances
- Dalian Electronic City (Chinese: 大连电子城)
- Pizza Hut
- Roosevelt Center (Chinese: 天兴 罗斯福)
  - Dalian HuaChen Cinplex (Chinese: 大连华臣影城)
  - Mykal Department Store
  - Amici Coffee
  - McCafé
  - Yoshinoya
- Sunrise Shopping Center(Chinese: 锦辉购物广场)
  - Carrefour
  - McDonald's
  - KFC
- Xinhua Bookstore's Northern Book Town (Chinese: 北方图书城)
- China Mobile, China Unicom and China Telecom Xi'an Road Sales Branches

=== Social service ===
- Dalian City Dentist Hospital (Chinese: 大连市口腔医院)
- Dalian Locomotive Hospital (Chinese: 大连机车医院)
- Dalian City Christian Church for Korean Chinese (Chinese: 大连市朝鲜族基督教堂)

=== Transportation ===
This section of Xi'an Road is crossed by Wuyi Road (Chinese: 五一路), Huanghe Road (Chinese: 黄河路) and Changjiang Road (Chinese: 长江路).

== See also ==
- Dalian City
- Qingniwaqiao
- Xi'an Road Subdistrict
