= Heishijiao Subdistrict =

Heishijiao 黑石礁街道
- Subdistrict
- Country: China
- Province: Liaoning
- Prefecture: Dalian
- District: Shahekou

Area
  - Total: 8.87 km^{2} (3.42 sq mi)

Population
  - Total: 110,000
  - Density: 12,000/km^{2} (32,000/sq mi)
- Time zone: UTC+8 (China Standard Time)
- Division code: 210204010000

Heishijiao Subdistrict is a township-level division of the Shahekou District of Dalian, Liaoning, China.

== Administration ==
There are 9 communities within the subdistrict.

Communities:

- Hongxingcun Community (红星村社区)
- Jianshan Community (尖山社区)
- Jingshan Community (景山社区)
- Lingshui Community (凌水社区)
- Youjia Community (由家社区)
- Shuxiangyuan Community (书香园社区)
- Zhenhua Community (振华社区)
- Gongjian Community (共建社区)
- Xi'nan Road Community (西南路社区)

== See also ==
- List of township-level divisions of Liaoning
- Shahekou
