= Malan Subdistrict =

Coordinates: 38°55′03″N 121°33′54″E

Malan 马栏街道
- Subdistrict
- Interactive map of Malan
- Country: China
- Province: Liaoning
- Prefecture: Dalian
- District: Shahekou

Area
  - Total: 6.23 km^{2} (2.41 sq mi)

Population
  - Total: 92,640
  - Density: 14,900/km^{2} (38,500/sq mi)
- Time zone: UTC+8 (China Standard Time)
- Division code: 210204008000

Malan Subdistrict is a subdistrict in Shahekou District, Dalian, Liaoning, China. The subdistrict spans an area of 6.23 square kilometres (2.41 mi^{2}), and reported a population of 92,640 in the 2010 Chinese Census.

== Administration ==
There are 14 communities within the subdistrict.

Communities:

- Guangchang Community (广场社区)
- Xiyuan Community (西苑社区)
- Hongling Community (红凌社区)
- Lanyuan Community (兰园社区)
- Xingfu Community (幸福社区)
- Lanqing Community (兰青社区)
- Chuandian Community (川甸社区)
- Wenyuan Community (文苑社区)
- Fumin Community (富民社区)
- Mantingfang Community (满庭芳社区)
- Hengyuan Community (恒苑社区)
- Daqing Community (大庆社区)
- Xishan Community (西山社区)
- Hongfa Community (宏发社区)

== See also ==
- List of township-level divisions of Liaoning
- Shahekou District
