= Chunliu Subdistrict =

Chunliu 春柳街道
- Subdistrict
- Country: China
- Province: Liaoning
- Prefecture: Dalian
- District: Shahekou

Area
  - Total: 4.8 km^{2} (1.9 sq mi)

Population
  - Total: 95,358
  - Density: 20,000/km^{2} (51,000/sq mi)
- Time zone: UTC+8 (China Standard Time)
- Division code: 210204006000

Chunliu Subdistrict is a township-level division of the Shahekou District of Dalian, Liaoning, China.

== Administration ==
There are 12 communities within the subdistrict.

Communities:

- Tai'an Community (泰安社区)
- Chunliu Community (春柳社区)
- Liujiaqiao Community (刘家桥社区)
- Dunhuang Community (敦煌社区)
- Shalong Community (沙龙社区)
- Huashun Community (华顺社区)
- Xiangsha Community (香沙社区)
- Xianghua Community (香华社区)
- Xinxing Community (新型社区)
- Shayuan Community (沙园社区)
- Shayue Community (沙跃社区)
- Sichou Road Community (丝绸路社区)

== See also ==
- List of township-level divisions of Liaoning
- Shahekou
