= Lijia Subdistrict, Dalian =

Lijia Subdistrict 李家街道
- Subdistrict
- Location in Liaoning
- Coordinates: 38°56′32″N 121°33′10″E
- Country: China
- Province: Liaoning
- Prefecture-level city: Dalian
- District: Shahekou District

Area
  - Total: 9.1 km^{2} (3.5 sq mi)

Population
  - Total: 123,000
  - Density: 14,000/km^{2} (35,000/sq mi)
- Time zone: UTC+8 (China Standard Time)
- Division code: 210204011000

Lijia Subdistrict (Chinese: 李家街道; pinyin: Lǐjiā Jiēdào) is a township-level division of the Shahekou District of Dalian, Liaoning, China. As of 2020, there are twelve residential communities within the subdistrict:

Communities:

- Wenyuan Community (文园社区)
- Fuyuan Community (福园社区)
- Lübo Community (绿波社区)
- Lüxiang Community (绿香社区)
- Jinyuan Community (锦苑社区)
- Jinyun Community (锦云社区)
- Jinxia Community (锦霞社区)
- Jinhong Community (锦虹社区)
- Jinhua Community (锦华社区)
- Lüyuan Community (绿苑社区)
- Lüjing Community (绿景社区)
- Jinxiu Community (锦绣社区)

== See also ==
- List of township-level divisions of Liaoning
