= Victory Square =

Victory Square may refer to:

== Belarus ==
- Victory Square, Minsk
- Victory Square (Vitebsk)

== Canada ==
- Victory Square, Vancouver, British Columbia

== China ==
- Victory Plaza, Guangzhou
- Victory Square (Dalian), Liaoning

== France ==
- Place des Victoires, Paris
- Place de la Victoire (Pointe-à-Pitre), in Pointe-à-Pitre, Guadeloupe

== Kyrgyzstan ==
- Victory Square, Bishkek

== Morocco ==
- Mohammed V Square, formerly Victory Square, in Casablanca

== New Zealand ==
- Victory Square, Nelson

== Poland ==
- Victory Square (Szczecin)
- Victory Square, a former name of the Piłsudski Square in Warsaw

== Romania ==
- Victory Square, Bucharest, Romania
- Victory Square, Timișoara

== Russia ==
- Victory Square, Moscow
- Victory Square, Saint Petersburg
- Victory Square, Kaliningrad

== Ukraine ==
- Halytska Square, Kyiv (formerly Victory Square)
- Victory Square, Chernihiv

== See also ==
- Victoria Square (disambiguation)
- Trafalgar Square in London, renamed Victory Square in George Orwell's Nineteen Eighty Four
