= Qingniwaqiao =

Qingniwaqiao Subdistrict 青泥洼桥街道
- Subdistrict

Chinese transcription(s)
  - Chinese: 青泥洼桥街道
  - Pinyin: Qīngníwāqiáo jiēdào
- Country: China
- Province: Liaoning
- Prefecture: Dalian
- District: Zhongshan
- Time zone: UTC+8 (China Standard Time)

Qingniwaqiao
- Simplified Chinese: 青泥洼桥
- Traditional Chinese: 青泥窪橋
Transcriptions
Standard Mandarin
- Hanyu Pinyin: Qīngníwāqiáo

Alternative Chinese name
- Simplified Chinese: 青泥洼桥街道
- Traditional Chinese: 青泥洼橋街道
Transcriptions
Standard Mandarin
- Hanyu Pinyin: Qīngníwāqiáo Jiēdào

Qingniwaqiao (Chinese: 青泥洼桥) is the downtown area of Dalian, Liaoning, China, located front of the Dalian railway station. The area shares its name with a broader subdistrict in Zhongshan District, the Qingniwaqiao Subdistrict (Chinese: 青泥洼桥街道; pinyin: Qīngníwāqiáo Jiēdào).

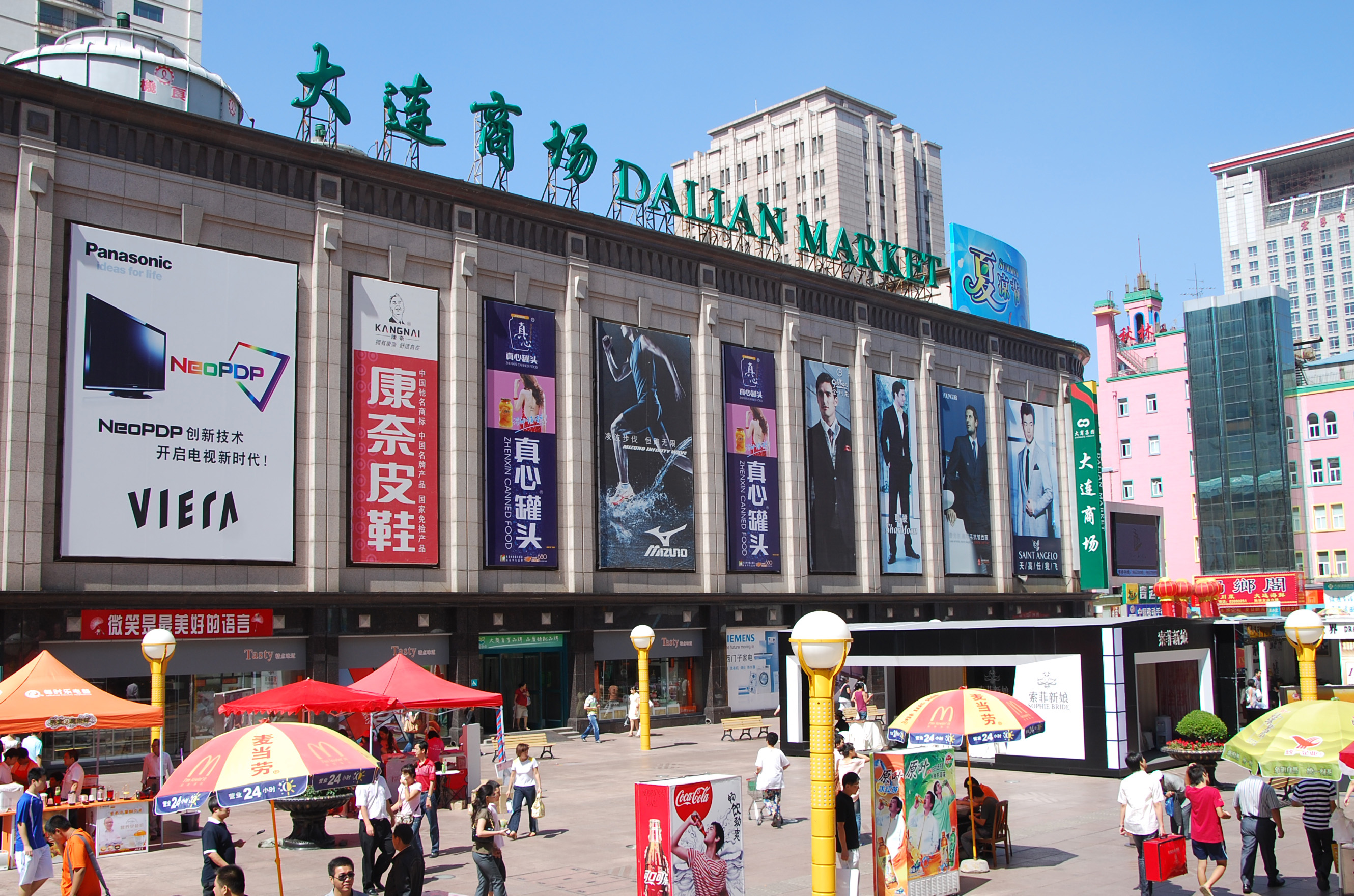
The pedestrian zone in front of Dashang Group's flagship store at Qingniwaqiao, Dalian, China

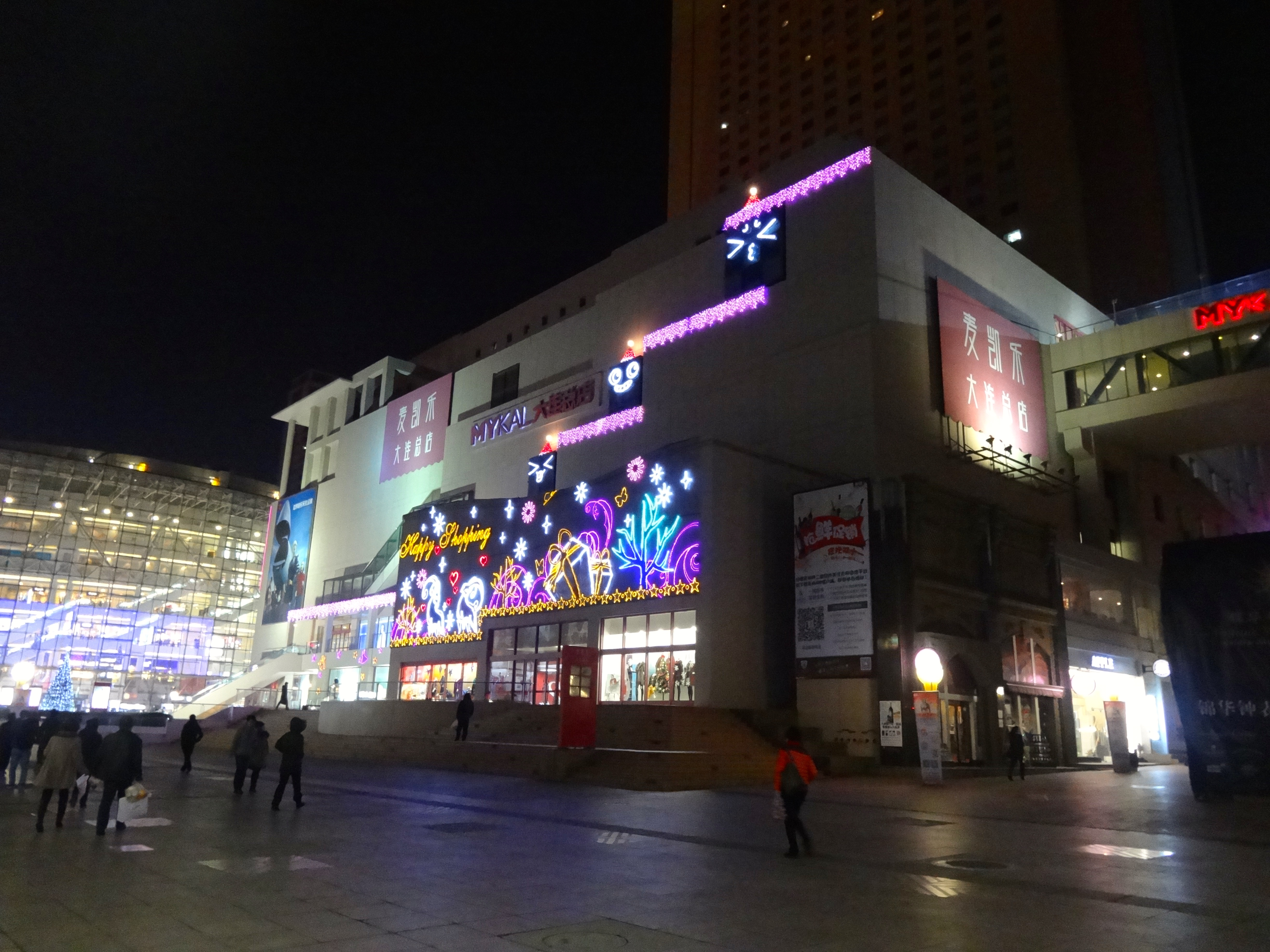
MYKAL Department Store

== History ==
Qingniwaqiao was originally a small fishing village in the 19th century whose name means the "bridge over the blue mud swamp". It was near Qingniwaqiao where the Russians chose to build their commercial town, leasing the naval port of Lushun and its surrounding area in 1898, which they called Dalny; this area later became the core of the city of Dalian.

== Geography ==
Qingniwaqiao is a rectangular area, demarked on the northern side by Changjiang Road (Chinese: 长江路), on the southern side by Wuhui Road (Chinese: 五惠路), on the eastern side by Jiefang Road (Chinese: 解放路) and on the western side by Youhao Street (Chinese: 友好街). In its center runs from east to west Zhongshan Road which is the main street of Dalian.

Dalian's central business district (CBD, Chinese: 中央商务区), extends from the east side of Qinagniwaqiao, along Zhongshan and Renmin Roads, via Friendship Square and Zhongshan Square, towards the Port of Dalian. It sometimes includes Hope Square and Dalian Mori Building on Qingniwaqiao's west side, along Zhongshan Road.

== Economy ==
Qingniwaqiao is Dalian's commercial center. Dashang Group, the largest retailer in Northeast China has its flagship store in Qingniwaqiao. Suning Appliance, GOME Electrical Appliances, Jiuguang Department Store, and the Pacific Department Store (in Chinese: 太平洋百货, Taiwan) all have locations at the site.

=== Victory Plaza ===
Invested by a Taiwanese company, there is a 3-storey underground shopping area under Victory Plaza, sandwiched between Changjiang and Zhongshan Roads. It is one of Dalian-ites' favorite pastimes to do (window) shopping or play bowling here, especially in winter. The plaza features, ranches of all major Chinese banks, including the Bank of Dalian headquarters, alongside hotels including Swissôtel, Ramada Hotel Zhongshan Hotel, Bohai Hotel, and Kempinski Hotel.

== Transportation ==
Qingniwaqiao is also the public transportation hub of Dalian City, with a metro, bus system, trolley bus and tramway, along with access to the Dalian railway station.

== See also ==
- List of township-level divisions of Liaoning
- Dalian
- Dashang Group
- Xi'an Road Commercial Zone
  - Xi'an Road Subdistrict
