= Xi'an Road Subdistrict =

Xi'an Road 西安路街道
- Subdistrict
- Location within Liaoning Location within China
- Coordinates: 38.91261°N 121.58143°E
- Country: China
- Province: Liaoning
- Prefecture: Dalian
- District: Shahekou

Area
  - Total: 5.83 km^{2} (2.25 sq mi)

Population
  - Total: 128,800
  - Density: 22,100/km^{2} (57,200/sq mi)
- Time zone: UTC+8 (China Standard Time)
- Division code: 210204018000

Xi'an Road Subdistrict is a township-level division in the east of the Shahekou District of Dalian, Liaoning, China.

== Administration ==
There are 14 communities within the subdistrict.

Communities:

- Tianxing Community (天兴社区)
- Yonglian Community (永联社区)
- Minquan Community (民权社区)
- Changjiang Community (长江社区)
- Minxing Community (民兴社区)
- Zhicheng Community (至诚社区)
- Yongshun Community (永顺社区)
- Huanghe Community (黄河社区)
- Xingxin Community (兴新社区)
- Xingshe Community (兴社社区)
- Xingsheng Community (兴盛社区)
- Ruyi Community (如意社区)
- Yongji Community (永吉社区)
- Quanyong Community (泉涌社区)

== See also ==
- List of township-level divisions of Liaoning
- Shahekou
  - Qingniwaqiao
- Xi'an Road Commercial Zone
