= Shahekou, Dalian =

Shahekou 沙河口区
- District
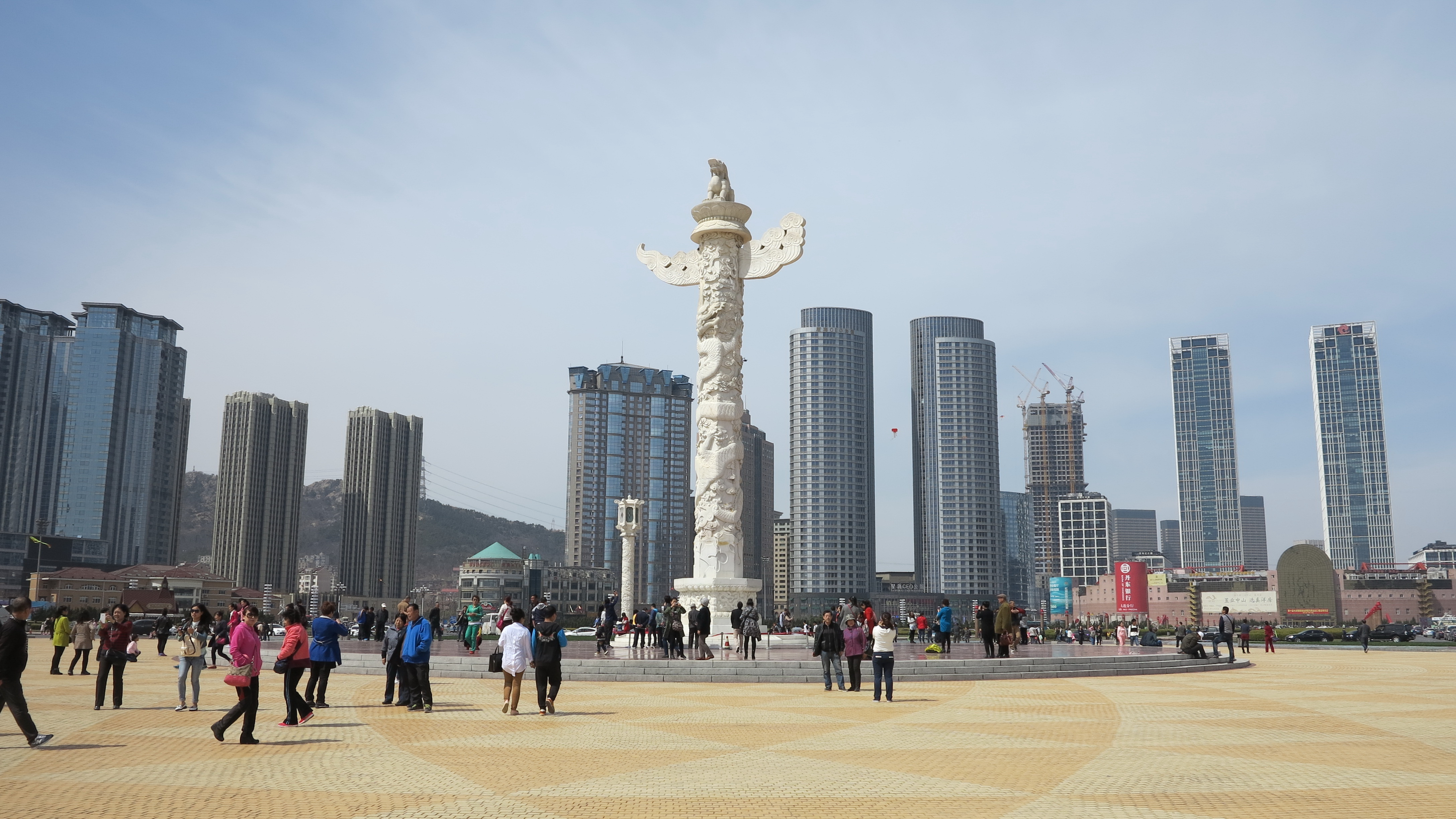
- Xinghai Square
- Interactive map of Shahekou
- Location in Liaoning
- Coordinates: 38°54′17″N 121°35′43″E
- Country: People's Republic of China
- Province: Liaoning
- Sub-provincial city: Dalian
- Seat: No. 393 Zhongshan Road (中山路393号)

Area
  - Total: 34.71 km^{2} (13.40 sq mi)

Population (2010)
  - Total: 693,140
  - Density: 19,970/km^{2} (51,720/sq mi)
- Time zone: UTC+8 (China Standard)
- Division code: 210204
- Website: www.dlshk.gov.cn

Shahekou District (simplified Chinese: 沙河口区; traditional Chinese: 沙河口區; pinyin: Shāhékǒu Qū) is one of the seven districts of Dalian, Liaoning province, People's Republic of China, forming part of the urban core. It is located in the western portion of the city. Its area is 34.71 square kilometres (13.40 sq mi) and its permanent population as of 2010 is 693,140, making it Dalian's most densely populated county-level division. Its postal code is 116021, and the district government is seated at 393 Zhongshan Road.

== Geography ==
The district's western portion is generally higher in elevation, and has seven notable peaks. The district has 8 kilometres (5.0 mi) of coastline.

=== Climate ===
Shahekou District experiences an average annual temperature of about 10 °C (50 °F), and generally experiences between 550 millimetres (22 in) and 950 millimetres (37 in) of precipitation annually.

== Administrative divisions ==
There are 7 subdistricts within the district.

Subdistricts:

- Xi'an Road Subdistrict (西安路街道)
- Chunliu Subdistrict (春柳街道)
- Malan Subdistrict (马栏街道)
- Nanshahekou Subdistrict (南沙河口街道)
- Heishijiao Subdistrict (黑石礁街道)
- Lijia Subdistrict (李家街道)
- Xinghaiwan Subdistrict (星海湾街道)

== Economy ==
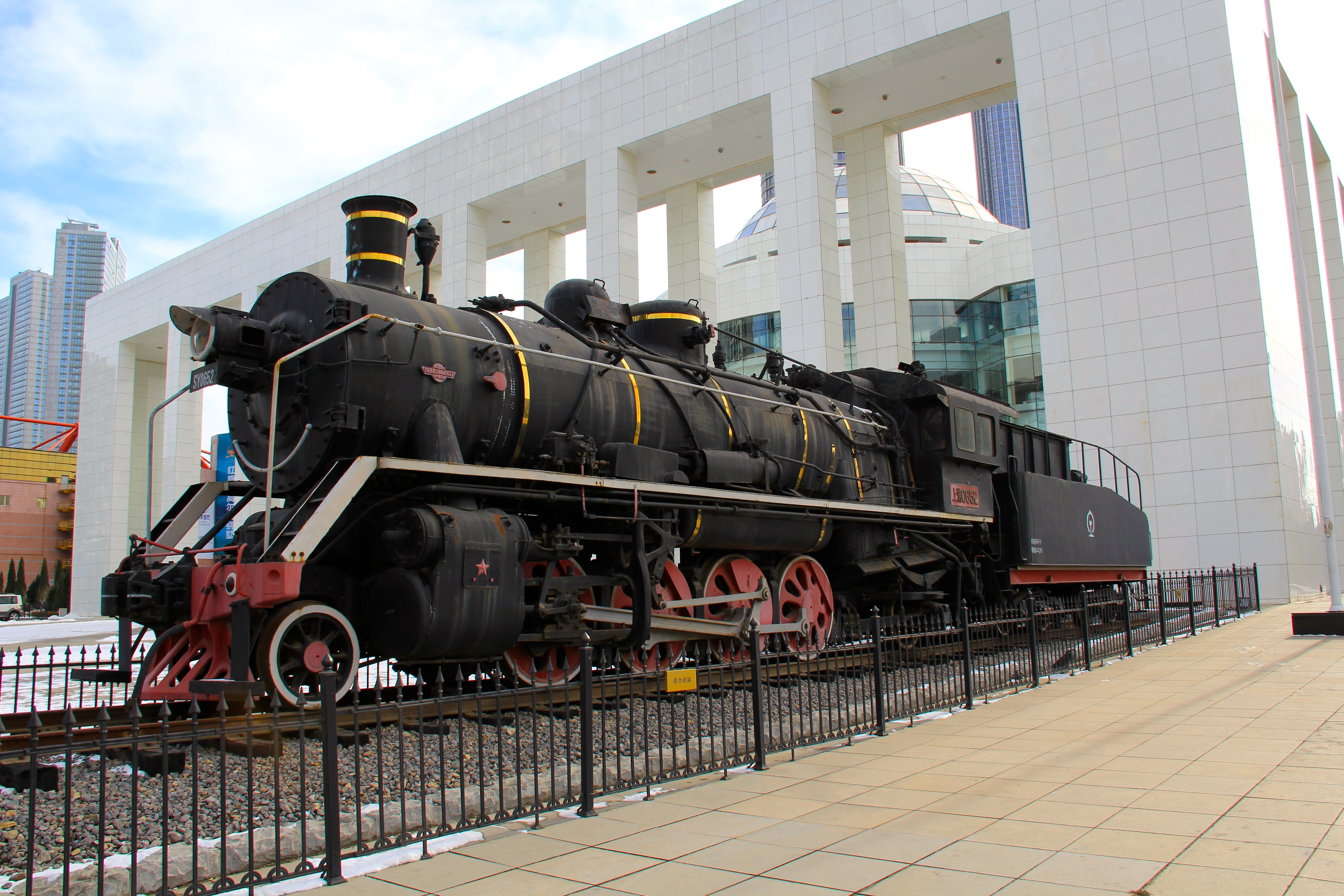
An old China Railways SY on display

Locomotive manufacturer CRRC Dalian has its headquarters in Shahekou District.

The Dalian Commodity Exchange is located in the district.

== Education ==
The following secondary schools are within Shahekou District:

- Dalian No. 3 High School
- Dalian No. 4 Middle School
- Dalian No. 8 High School
- Dalian No. 13 High School
- Dalian No. 47 Middle School
- Dalian No. 48 High School
- Dalian No. 79 Middle School
- Dalian Yuming Senior High School
- High School Affiliated to Liaoning Normal University

The following universities are within Shahekou District:

- Dongbei University of Finance and Economics
- Liaoning Normal University
- Dalian Jiaotong University
- Dalian Ocean University

== Tourist sites ==
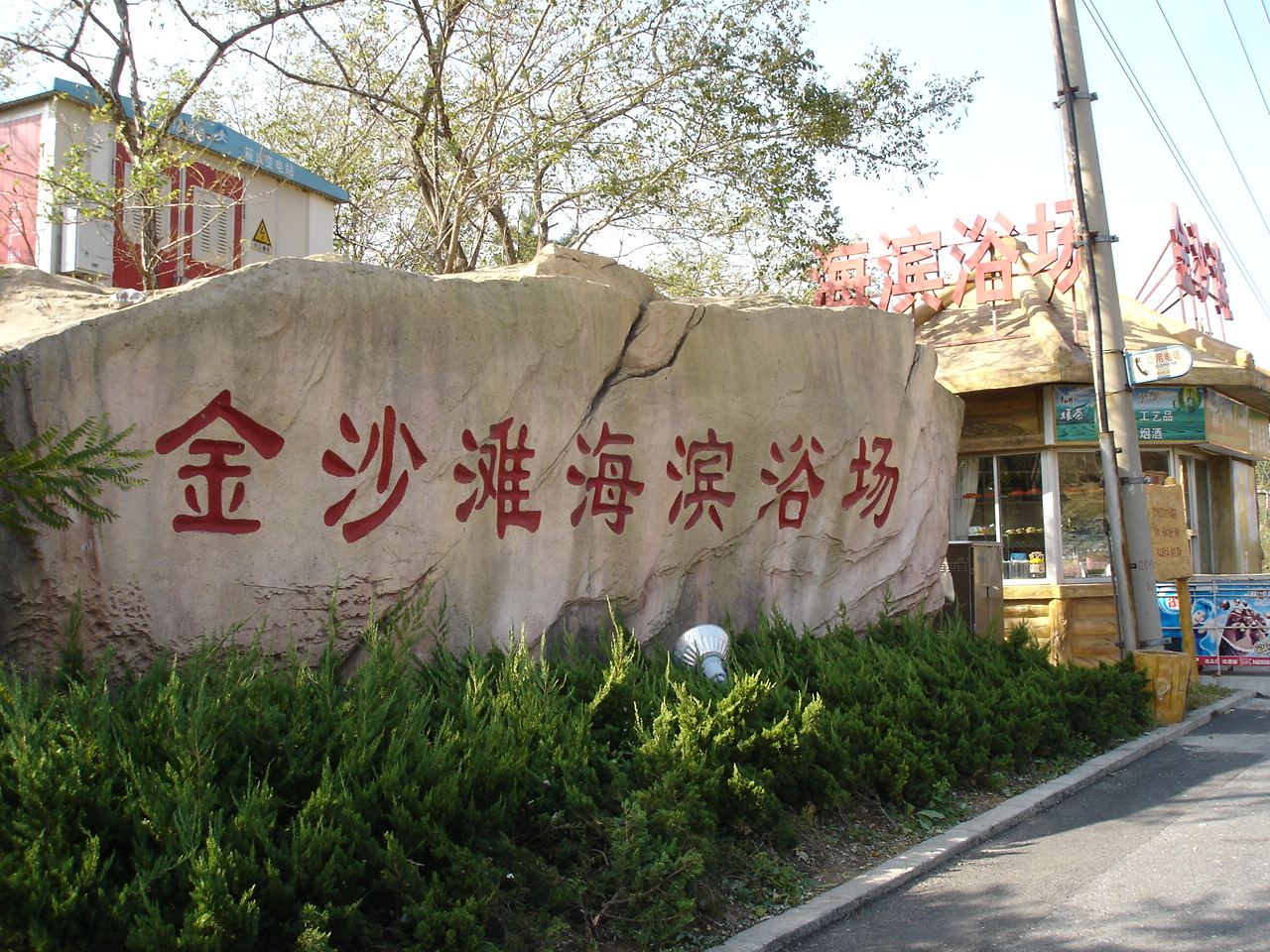
A sign indicating a public bath near Golden Beach

Major sites in Shahekou District include Xinghai Square, Golden Beach and Zhongshan Park.
