= Dalian People's Culture Club =

Dalian People's Culture Club (Chinese: 大连人民文化俱乐部) is a concert hall located on Zhongshan Square in Dalian, Liaoning Province, China. Built in the European style in 1951, while the Russian troops were still stationed in Lushun and Dalian, it is one of the premium concert halls in Dalian.

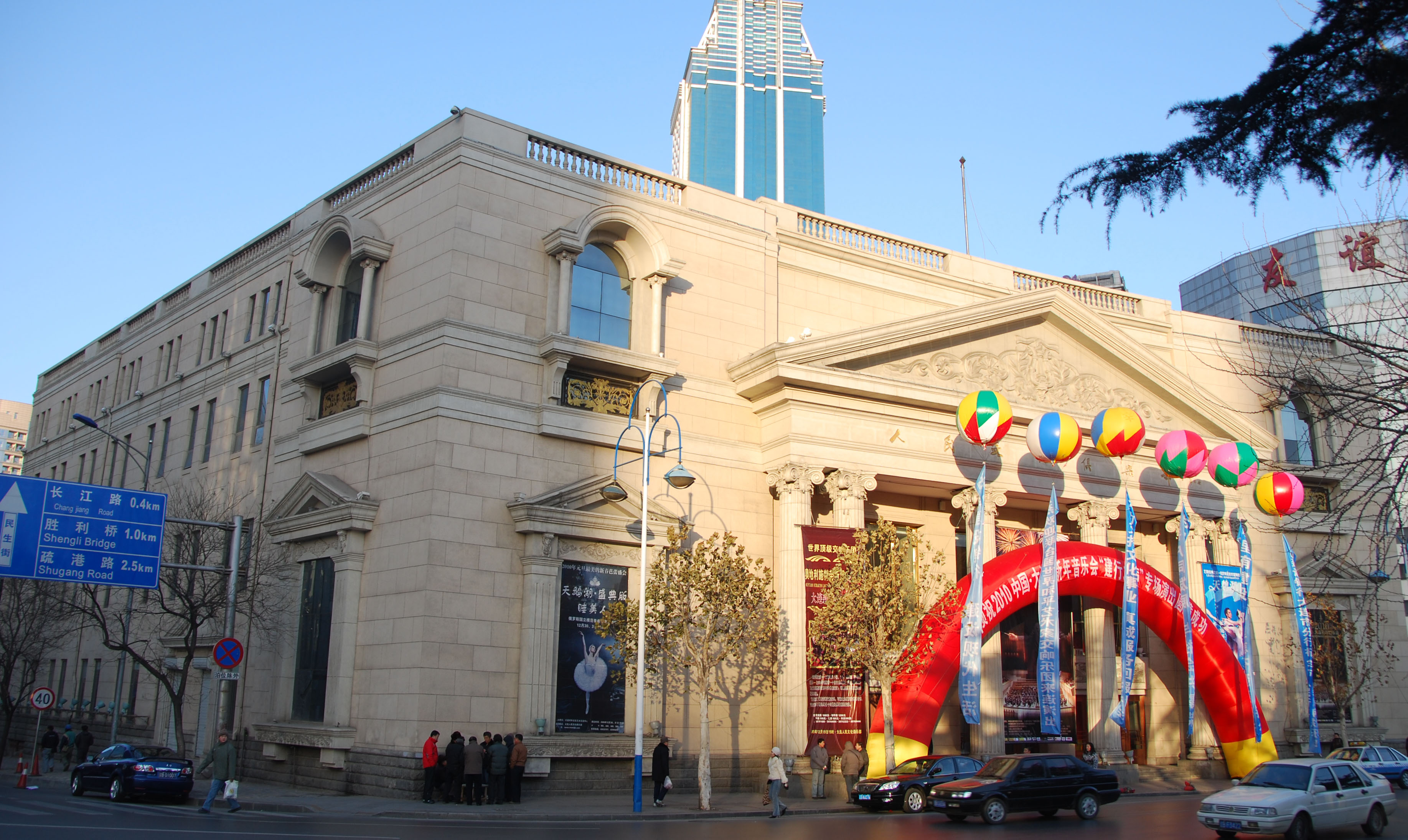
Dalian People's Culture Club in December, which is the busiest month.

== History ==
Dalian People's Culture Club has the following history:

- 1951 - Construction was started under the design of the Soviet team, led by a White Russian, while the Russian troops were still stationed in Lushun and Dalian.
- 1952 - Building construction was completed. It was given the name of the Dalian People's Culture Club by Guo Moruo
- 1953 - Zhou Enlai, Liu Shaoqi, Soong Ching-ling and other members of Central Committee of the Chinese Communist Party came to Dalian and had a national level festival, inviting many Chinese and foreign guest.
- 1995 - First renovation
- 2008 - Second renovation

== Features of the Hall ==
There are 600 seats on the first floor and 400 seats on the second floor, a total of 1,000 seats. The building is located at: 8 Zhongshan Square, Zhongshan District, Dalian, China

== Concert halls in Dalian ==
There are the following concert halls in Dalian:

- Dalian Development Area Grand Theatre
- Dalian People's Culture Club
- Grand Hall of Dalian TV Station
- Auditorium of Dalian University of Technology
- Auditorium of Dalian Maritime University
- Auditorium of Dalian City Young Pioneers' Palace
- Auditorium of Dalian City No. 44 Middle School

== See also ==
- Dalian
- Concert halls
- Theater
- Modern Buildings on Zhongshan Square in Dalian
