= Kunming (disambiguation) =

Kunming is the capital and largest city of Yunnan province, China.

Kunming may also refer to:

- Kunming Airlines, a Chinese airlines based in Kunming
- Kunming dialect, a dialect of Southwestern Mandarin Chinese
- Kunming dog, a wolf-dog breed of working dog
- Kunming Lake (Beijing), the central lake on the grounds of the Summer Palace in Beijing, China
- Kunming Lake (Kunming), a lake near Kunming, China
- Kunming Subdistrict, a former subdistrict in Zhongshan District, Dalian, Liaoning, China
- 3650 Kunming, a minor planet
- Huang Kunming (born 1956), Chinese politician

== See also ==
- Kunming attack (disambiguation)
