= Tsumaki Yorinaka =

Japanese architect (1859–1916)

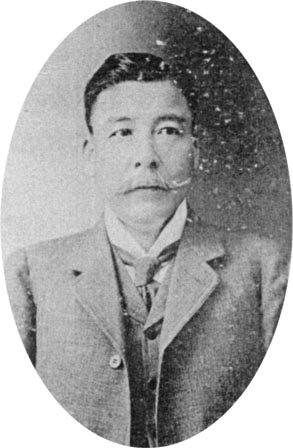
- Tsumaki Yorinaka
- Born: 22 February 1859; Tokyo, Japan
- Died: 10 October 1916 (aged 57); Tokyo, Japan
- Education: Imperial College of Engineering, Cornell University
- Occupation: Architect
- Design: Nihonbashi Bridge (1911)

Tsumaki Yorinaka (妻木 頼黄, February 22, 1859—October 10, 1916) was a Japanese architect and Head of the Japanese Ministry of Finance building section in the later Meiji period.

He was credited with the design of many significant Meiji era structures in Japan, notably the Nihonbashi Bridge.

== Early life and career ==
Together with Katayama Tokuma, Tatsuno Kingo, Sone Tatsuzō and Satachi Shichijiro, one of a group of renowned architectural students at the Imperial College of Engineering, Tokyo, and a protege of British architect Josiah Conder.

Tsumaki continued his studies in the United States where he graduated with a degree in Architecture from Cornell University in 1894. He then went back to Japan, employed as a public servant at the Metropolitan Tokyo Government.

Tsumaki was appointed by the Ministry of Finance at its Temporary Office for Architecture and Buildings (TOAB) in 1888, and as the government of Japan commissioned the city planning project to the office of Wilhelm Böckmann and Hermann Ende, Tsumaki along with architects and carpenters were sent to Berlin for further study in the same field, working at the same time in the architectural offices.

Yama'o Yōzō took the chair of the TOAB while Tsumaki was abroad, and announced to Böckmann's office that the zoning project would respect budget, against the blue print Böckmann had presented to the government already, or rather than how the capital and its government buildings would look, to resort to wooden structure for the first (1890–1891) and the second (1891–1925) buildings of the National Diet Hall.

Tatsuno, Tsumaki's senior at the Imperial College of Engineering, was against Tsumaki's initiative and petitioned to hold an open competition for planning the Diet Hall, which Tsumaki was pushing his own plan with brick and mortar. Then, on June 8, 1912, the City of Tokyo was damaged extensively with a magnitude 6+ earthquake, and the Katsura Cabinet being overturned which had supported Tsumaki's plan, Tsumaki resigned from his office at the Ministry of Finance in 1913. It was long after Tsumaki's death in 1916 when finally the National Diet building was relocated to the present address in Nagata-chō, Minato Ward, which was built with iron frames and marble in 1936.

== Buildings and Structures ==
- Sugamo Prison (1896)
- Handa Red Brick Building (1898)
- Yokohama Specie Bank, Yokohama Head Office (1904). Since 1968 the building has been used as the Kanagawa Prefectural Museum of Cultural History
- Yokohama Specie Bank Dalian Branch (1909). Currently the Dalian branch of the Bank of China.
- Yokohama Red Brick Warehouse No. 2 Building (1911)
- Nihonbashi Bridge (1911)
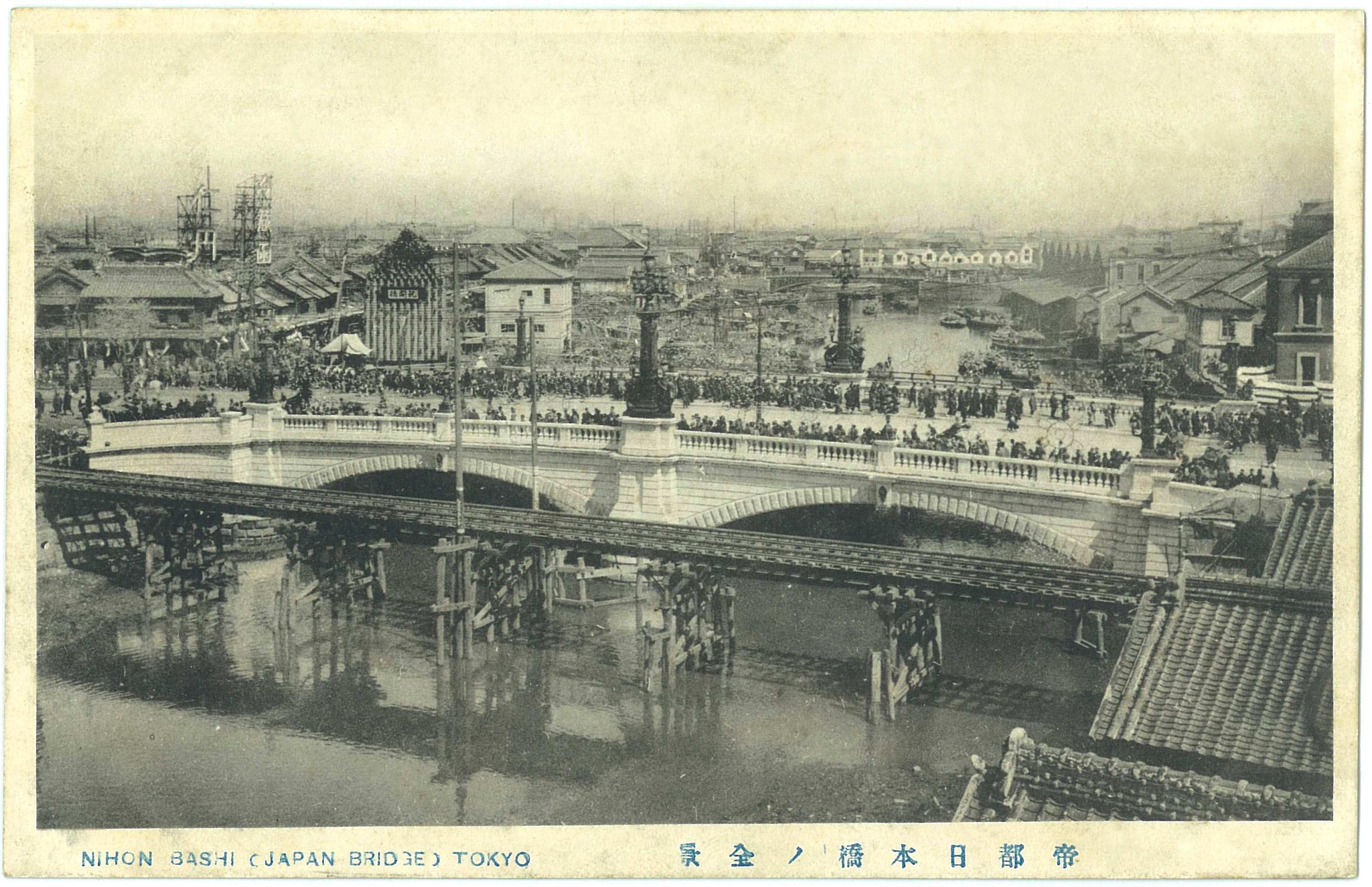
Nihonbashi Bridge, shortly after opening in 1911

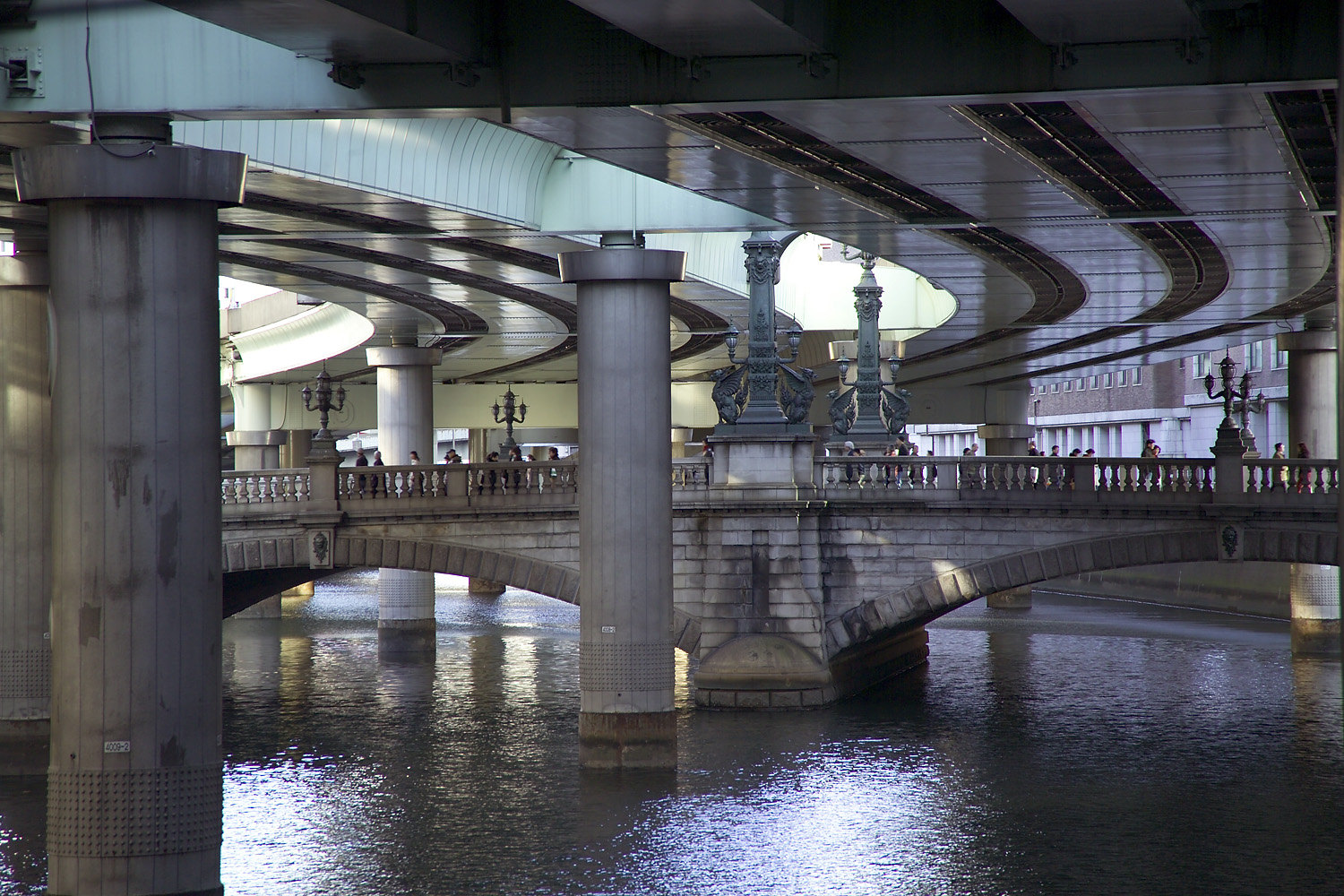
Nihonbashi Bridge, with the Shuto Expressway pictured overhead, 2007
