= Zhongshan Square =

Square in Dalian, Liaoning, China

Coordinates: 38°55′15″N 121°38′20″E

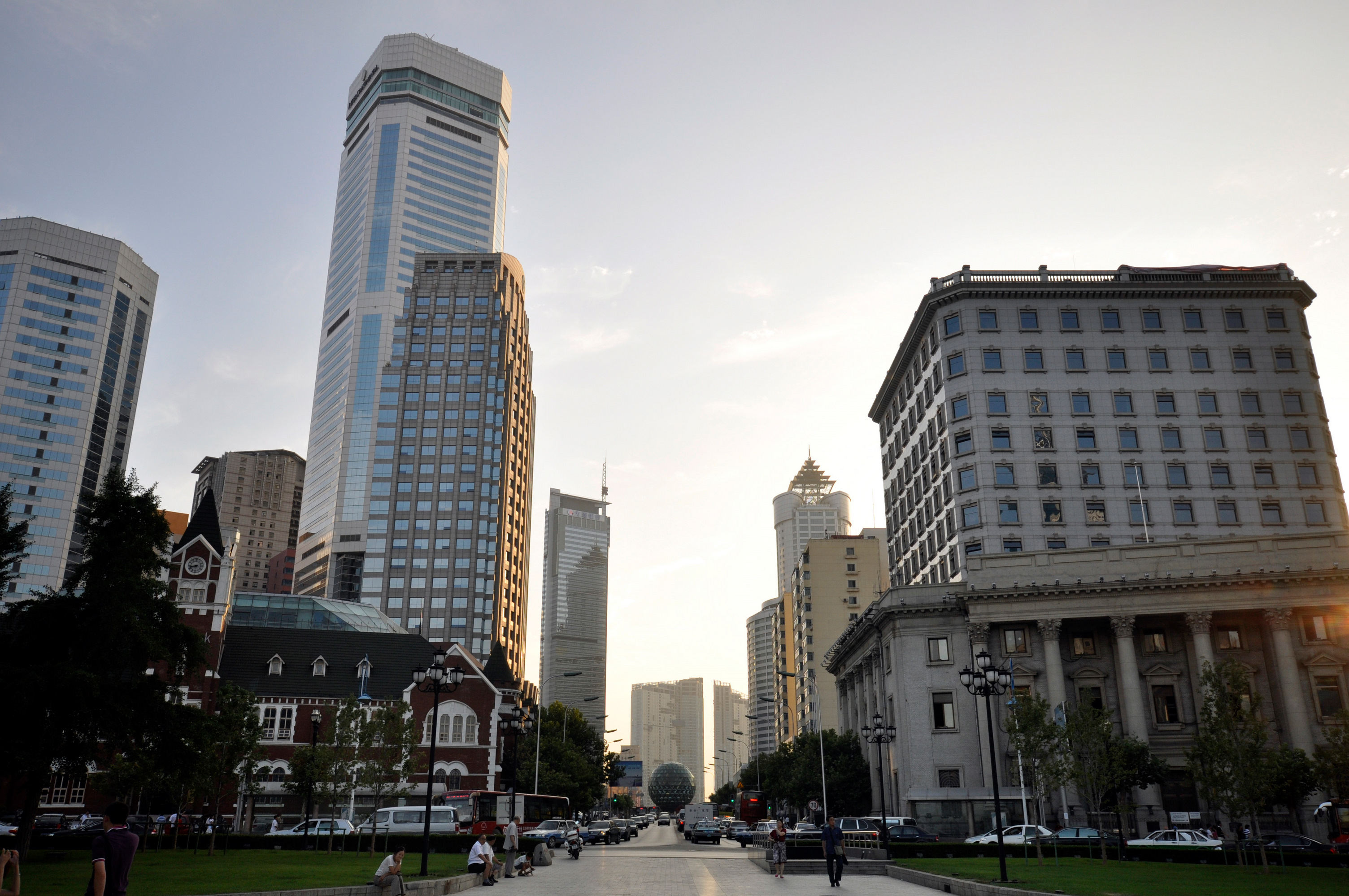
Zhongshan Square, Dalian (2009)

Zhongshan Square (simplified Chinese: 中山广场; traditional Chinese: 中山廣場; pinyin: Zhōngshān Guǎngchǎng) is a city square in the Zhongshan District of Dalian, Liaoning, China named for Sun Yat-sen (popularly known as Sun Zhongshan); originally designed and built by the Russians in the 19th century. Several classical buildings are located on the square, which were built during the first half of the 20th century by the Japanese.

== History ==
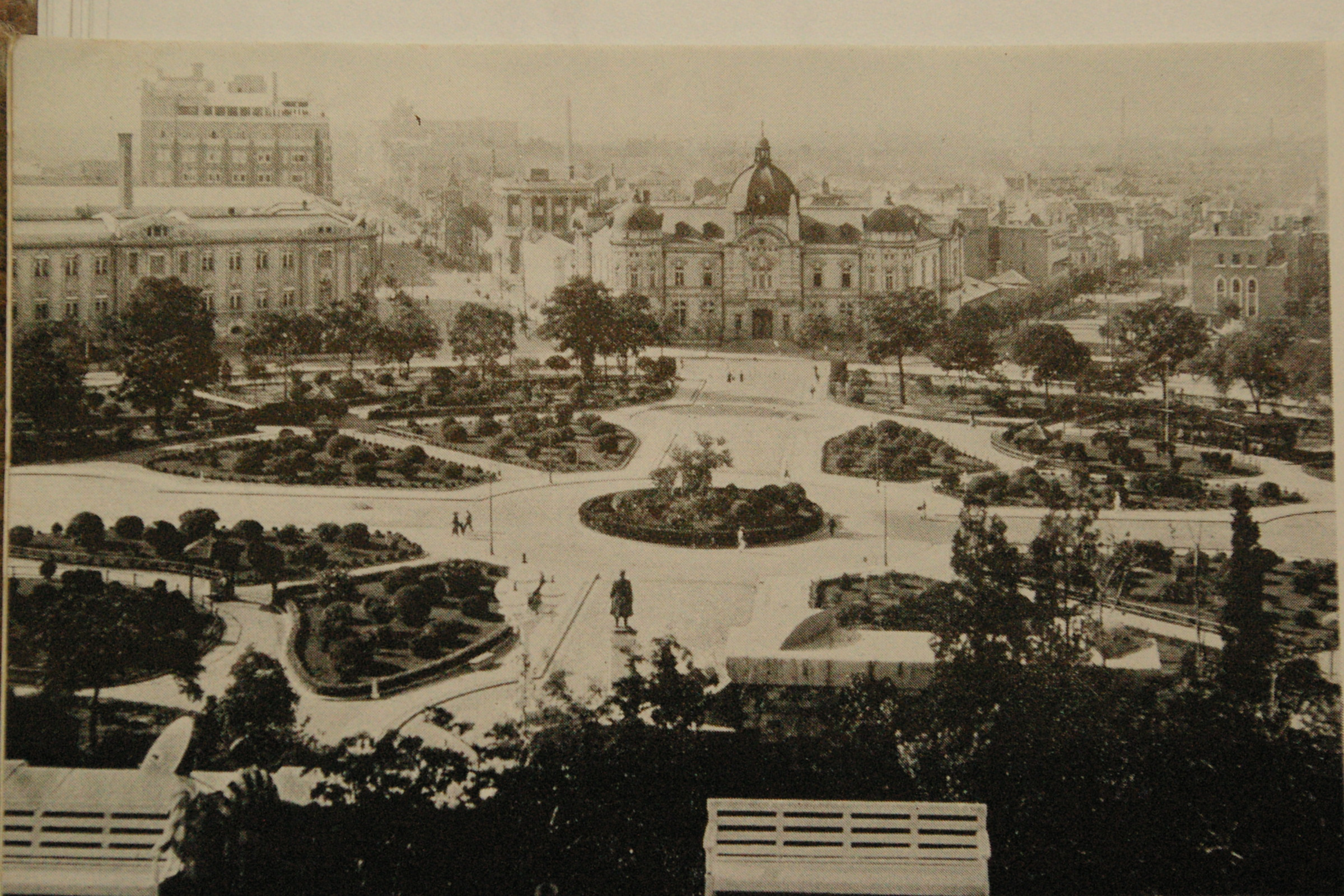
Zhongshan Square in 1940, then called Ōhiroba

The square was originally built in 1898 as Nikolayevskaya Square (Russian: Николаевская площадь, 'Nicholas II's plaza'), when the Russian Empire controlled Dalian (the then Port Arthur).

When Manchuria came under Japanese rule, it was renamed by the Japanese to 'Ōhiroba' (Japanese: 大広場), 'the large plaza')—with the Friendship Square (友好广场; 友好廣場), then known as Nishihiroba (西広場, 'west square'), being the 'small plaza'. In 1945, after the Japanese withdrawal, it was finally renamed Zhongshan Square in honor of Sun Zhongshan (Sun Yat-sen), the first president of the Republic of China.

In 1995, 36 sets of audio systems were installed at Zhongshan Square making it the first 'musical square' in China.

== Design ==
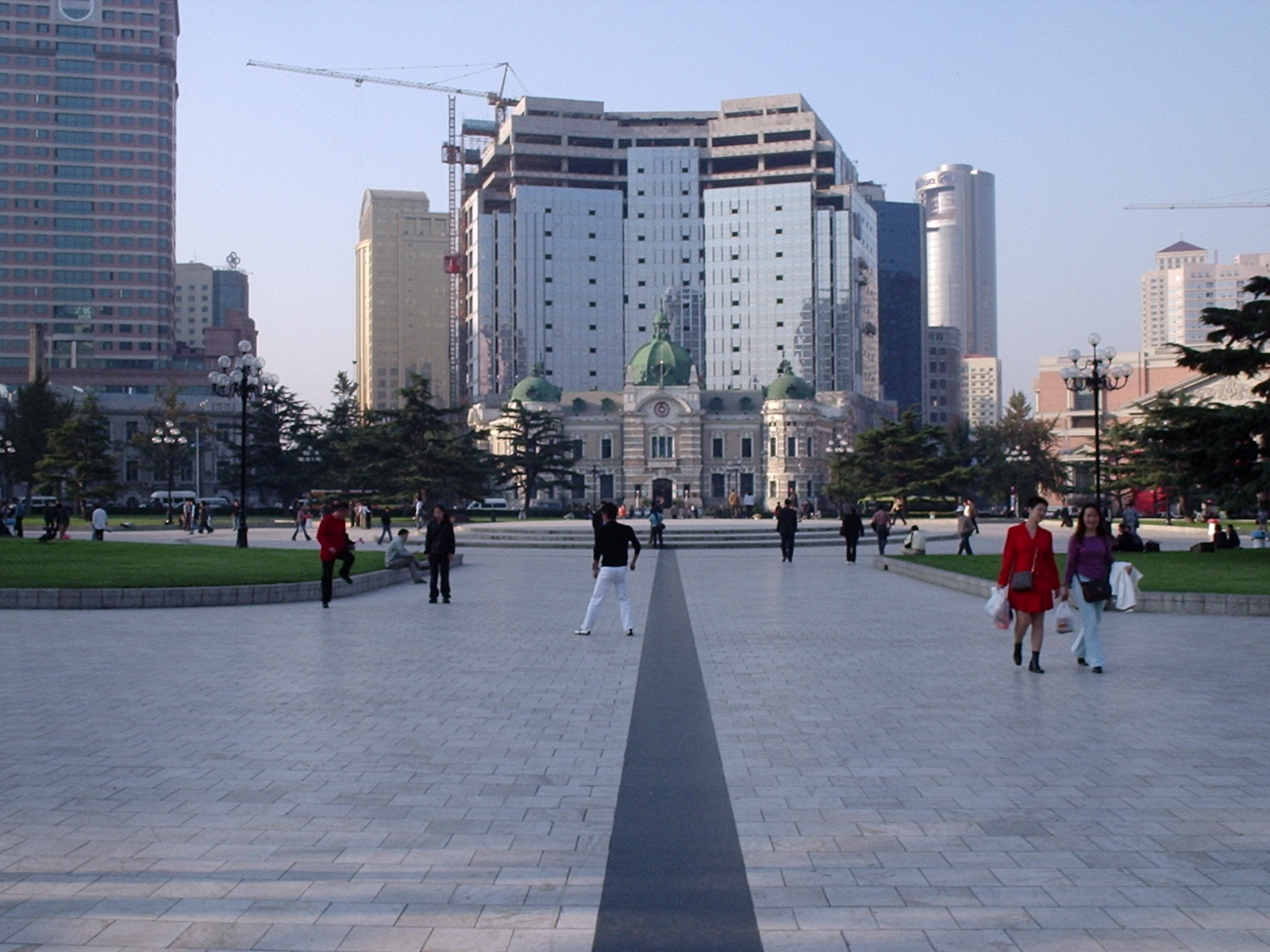
Zhongshan Square in June 2006

Zhongshan Square is 213 metres (699 ft) in diameter. Inside the five-lane roundabout there is a green zone and a paved area where people gather to dance on summer evenings, participate in foreign language corners, or do other activities. There are pedestrian underpasses leading to the inside of the square from both the Zhongshan and Renmin roads.

The ten roads that radiate from the square in clockwise order are:

- Shanghai Road (上海路) - north
- Minsheng Street (民生街)
- Qiyi Street (七一街)
- Renmin Road (人民路) - east
- Luxun Road (鲁迅路)
- Jiefang Street (解放街)
- Yan'an Road (延安路) - south
- Yuguang Street (玉光街)
- Zhongshan Road (中山路) - west
- Minkang Street (民康街)

The Renmin and Zhangshan roads make up the main east-west artery of the downtown Dalian area. East of the square is the Renmin road, passing through the hotel area toward Gangwan Square, near the Port of Dalian. West of the square is Zhongshan Road, passing through Friendship Square, Qingniwaqiao, and the City Hall, toward Lüshun.

== Business center ==
Located at the center of Dalian's Zhongshan District, Zhongshan Square and the adjacent Zhongshan and Renmin roads are a part of Dalian's central business district.

== See also ==
- Dalian
- Modern Buildings on Zhongshan Square in Dalian
- Central business district
- Russian Dalian
