= 1912 Acambay earthquake =

Earthquake in Mexico

- Location within Mexico
- UTC time: 1912-11-19 13:55:03
- ISC event: 16958218
- USGS-ANSS: ComCat
- Local date: 19 November 1912
- Local time: 07:55
- Magnitude: 6.7 M_{w}
- Depth: 15 km (9.3 mi)
- Epicenter: 19.83°N 99.92°W
- Type: Normal
- Areas affected: Mexico
- Max. intensity: MMI XI (Extreme)
- Aftershocks: 60
- Casualties: 140–1,200 killed

The 1912 Acambay earthquake affected central Mexico on 19 November at 07:55 local time (UTC−06:00). It had a moment magnitude of 6.7 M_{w} and an epicenter in the Acambay graben, 100 km (62 mi) northwest of Mexico City. Damage was severe in Acambay and several nearby villages, and the casualty toll ranged between 140 and 1,200. There was also significant damage in Mexico City and one fatality. The earthquake occurred along three fault zones that bound the Acambay graben, an extensional tectonic feature located within the Trans-Mexican Volcanic Belt. Surface ruptures were observed on these fault zones.

== Tectonic setting ==
The Trans-Mexican Volcanic Belt (TMVB) spans across central Mexico, from near the Pacific coast to the Gulf of Mexico, for more than 1,000 km (620 mi). The volcanic activity is related to subduction of the Cocos and Rivera plates beneath the North American plate. Beneath North America, these plates subduct into the mantle, causing it to partially melt. The melted mantle material rises through the North American plate, forming volcanoes on the surface. Within the TMVB, active extensional tectonics is ongoing, particularly prominent west of the 100°W latitude. The cause of this extension may be caused by the North American plate reaching a state of isostatic equilibrium because of the large load exerted by the TMVB. Within the central part of the TMVB, east–west trending normal faults can produce earthquakes. Some of these faults form escarpments visible for 60 km (37 mi). The overlying Holocene alluvium and Quaternary cinder cones have shown displacements caused by these faults.

== Earthquake ==
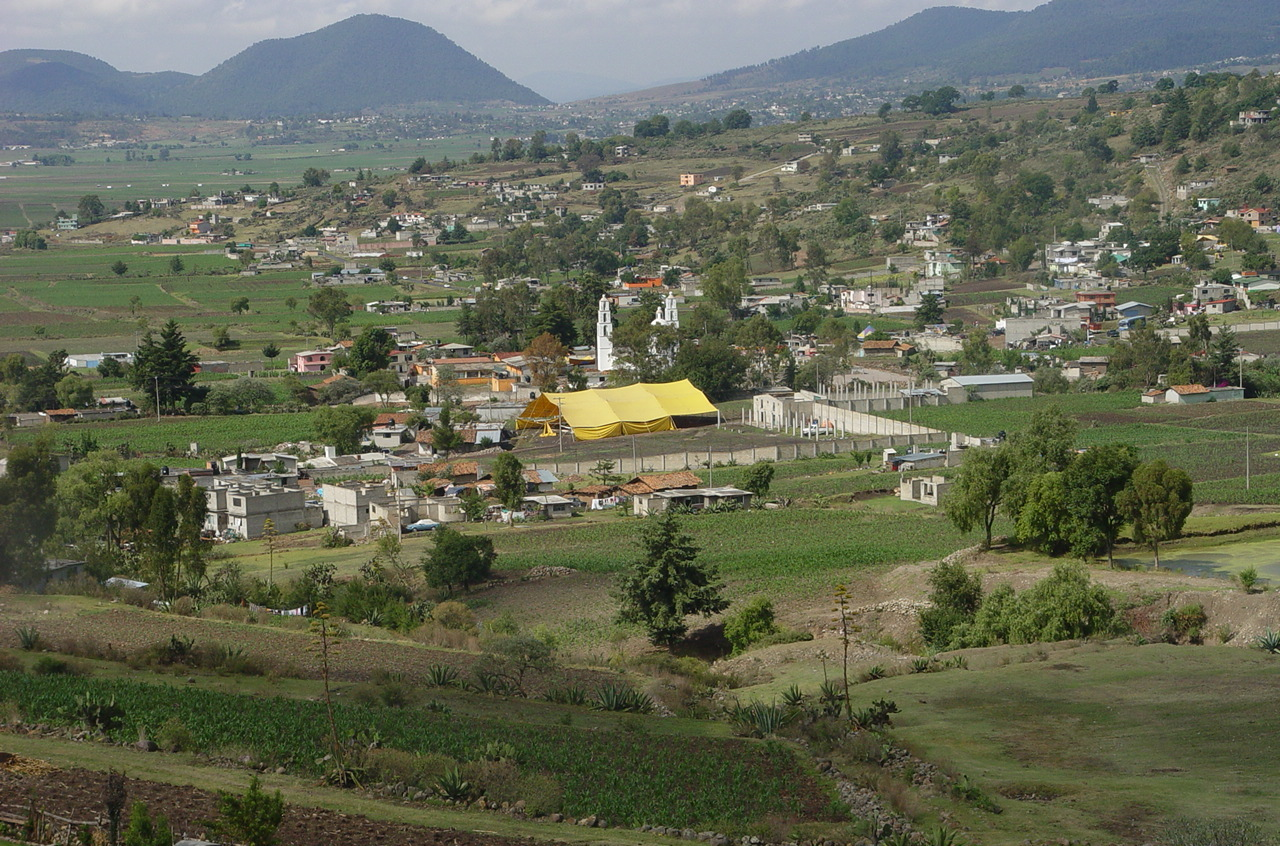
The town of Detiña is at the graben's northern boundary

The earthquake, with a magnitude of M_{w} 6.7, struck on 19 November at 07:55 local time (UTC−06:00). It occurred with an epicenter near the southern Acambay graben in the central region of the TMVB. This graben, located 100 km (62 mi) northwest of Mexico City, measures 40 km (25 mi) long and 15 km (9.3 mi) across. A maximum Modified Mercalli intensity of XI (Extreme) was observed at several locations within the graben.

The graben features three faults; the Acambay–Tixmadejé and Pastores faults which forms its northern and southern boundary, and a central fault inside the structure. The Acambay–Tixmadejé Fault is a 42 km (26 mi)-long normal fault that dips at 60–70° southwards. The Pastores Fault extends 27 km (17 mi) and at the surface, exhibits 110–150 m (360–490 ft) tall scarps. The intragraben fault zone stretches across the Temascalcingo volcano featuring multiple strands that rupture through the volcano. Surface ruptures were observed along these fault zones.

The Acambay-Tixmadejé Fault produced a 41 km (25 mi)-long surface rupture, starting west at San José Solís, passing 1 km (0.62 mi) north of Acambay, and terminating near the Huapango reservoir. The largest vertical displacement, 50 cm (20 in), occurred near Tixmadejé village, about midpoint along the rupture between Acambay and San José Solís. East of the reservoir, a northwest–southeast trending rupture, likely an extension of the Acambay–Tixmadejé Fault, extends for 2 km (1.2 mi) with vertical displacements of 12–20 cm (4.7–7.9 in). On the Pastores Fault, a 17 km (11 mi) rupture trending east–west occurred between Santiago Coachochitlán and Mayé el Fresno. Within the graben, three parallel ruptures were recorded near Temascalcingo, corresponding to the intragraben fault zone, with the longest extending 20 km (12 mi). Sixty aftershocks were recorded between 19 November 1912 and 15 April 1913.

== Impact ==
The number of casualties varied across newspaper reports. According to the Mexican government, citing El Imparcial on 21 November, at least 140 people died. Citing the Mexican interior secretariat, Meriden Daily Journal reported on 22 November that over 1,200 people were killed. An additional nine deaths was reported in Temaxculcingo, three in Atlacomulco and one in Eloro. Many of the dead were never recovered from the rubble and their decomposing bodies attracted pests. The town of Acambay was levelled; few buildings remained undamaged, and several nearby villages were also destroyed. Among the casualties, more than 100 worshippers died when a church collapsed onto the crowd. As wells, springs and streams dried up following the earthquake, some survivors resorted to ponds as a means of water. Their frequent reliance made these ponds a source for contagious and deadly viruses. Rebels from outside the area looted the affected communities and attacked its residents. In response to this rebel presence, the Mexican government said they would deploy soldiers to defend the area and allow outside assistance to enter. In parts of Mexico City, the earthquake knocked out gas and water services. At least one person died and many others were injured in the city. Cracks appeared in the walls of the National Palace while some poorly constructed homes collapsed, and on the streets, water pipes ruptured and roads buckled. During January 1913, an unspecified number of people also died from starvation.

== See also ==
- List of earthquakes in 1912
- List of earthquakes in Mexico
