= Modern Buildings on Zhongshan Square in Dalian =

Coordinates: 38°55′15″N 121°38′20″E

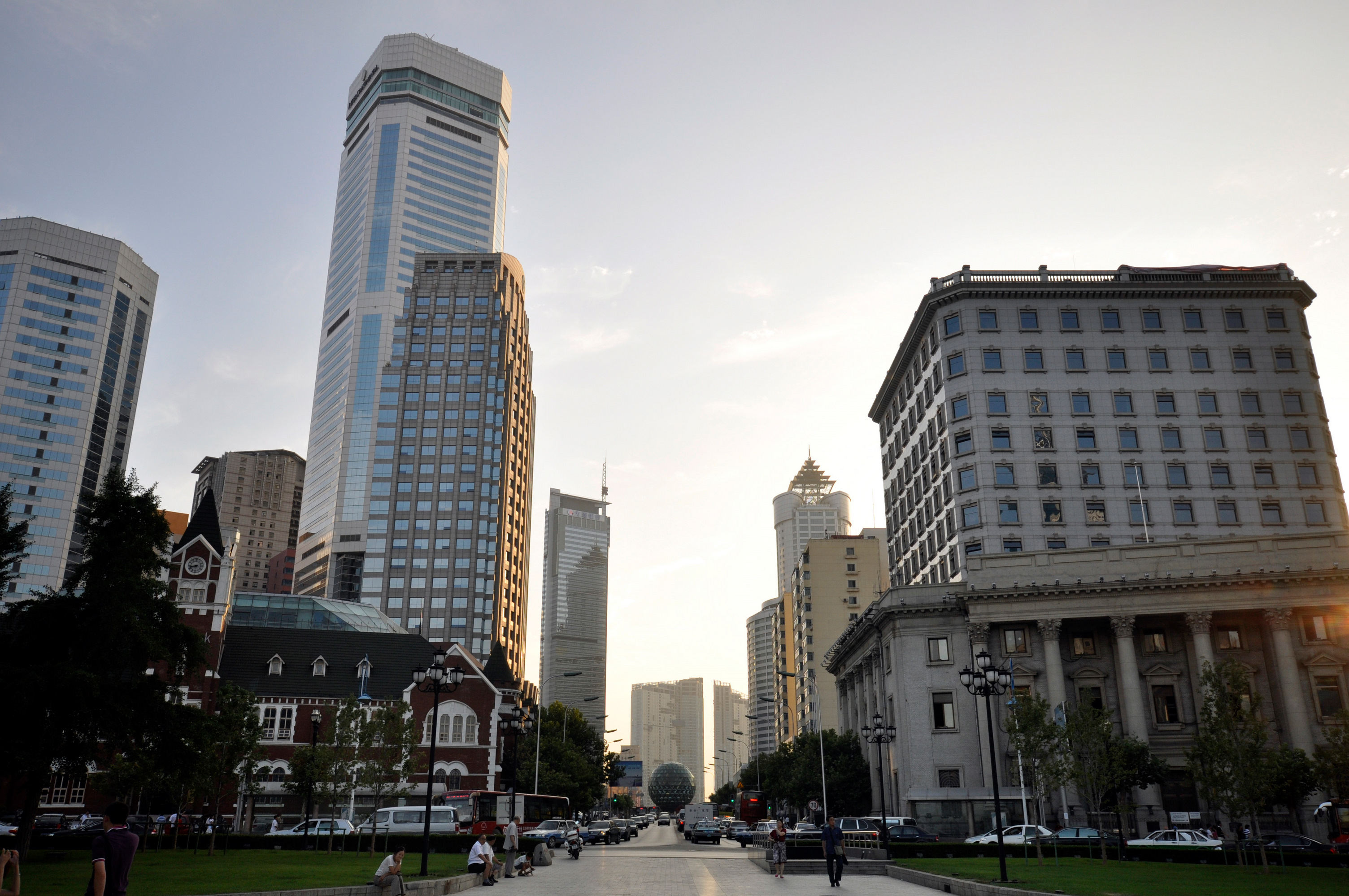
Zhongshan Square, Dalian (2009)

The modern buildings on Zhongshan Square in Dalian refer to the buildings on Zhongshan Square in Dalian, Liaoning Province, China, built mostly in the first half of the twentieth century, during which time Dalian was Japan's leased territory.

These buildings were declared the "Cultural Heritage Sites under Protection by the Chinese State Government" in 2001 and the "Heritage Buildings under Protection by the Dalian Municipal Government" in 2002. The scene of this area with the modern buildings of the first half of the 20th century in China is comparable, in a smaller scale, to that of The Shanghai Bund.

== Zhongshan Square ==
Zhongshan Square in Dalian was originally built by the Russians as Nikolayevskaya Square (in Russian: Николаевская площадь, meaning Nikolai's plaza) in 1898. It was later renamed by the Japanese as Ōhiroba (in Japanese: 大広場), meaning the large plaza. After 1945, it was further renamed as Zhongshan Square, after Sun Zhongshan, the first president of the Republic of China.

The square is round and is 213 meters in diameter. There are ten roads that come radially out of the square, anticlockwise:

- Zhongshan Road (Chinese: 中山路) - west
- Yuguang Street (Chinese: 玉光街)
- Yan'an Road (Chinese: 延安路) - south
- Jiefang Street (Chinese: 解放街)
- Luxun Road (Chinese: 鲁迅路)
- Renmin Road (Chinese: 人民路) - east
- Qiyi Street (Chinese: 七一街)
- Minsheng Street (Chinese: 民生街)
- Shanghai Road (Chinese: 上海路) - north
- Minkang Street (Chinese: 民康街)

== The Buildings ==
On Zhongshan Square, there are presently ten buildings. They are from the building with the address of No. 1 Zhongshan Square, on the north side, with the names of the current occupants, anticlockwise:

=== Industrial and Commercial Bank of China #1 ===
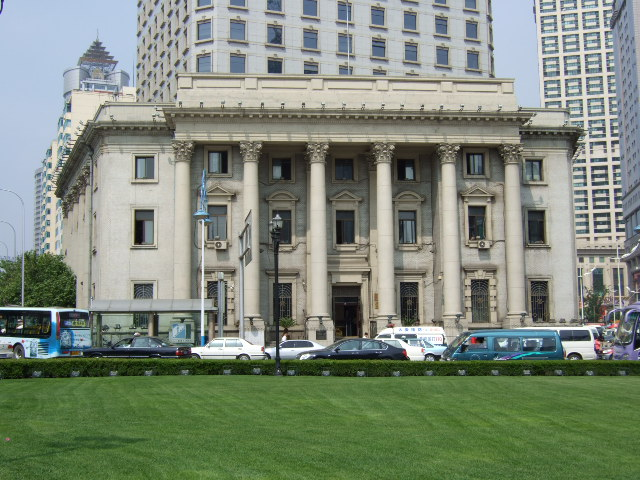
Industrial and Commercial Bank of China's Dalian Branch was built in 1920 for the Bank of Chōsen.

The Renaissance architecture building with Corinthian columns in front at No. 1 Zhongshan Square, between Minkang Street and Zhongshan Road, is now Industrial and Commercial Bank of China's Zhongshan Square Branch (Chinese: 中国工商银行中山广场支行).

It was built in December, 1920, as Dalian Branch of the Bank of Chōsen (in Japanese: 朝鮮銀行). Architect: Yoshihei Nakamura (in Japanese: 中村與資平), residing in Korea at that time, designing the headquarters building of this bank.

=== Citibank ===
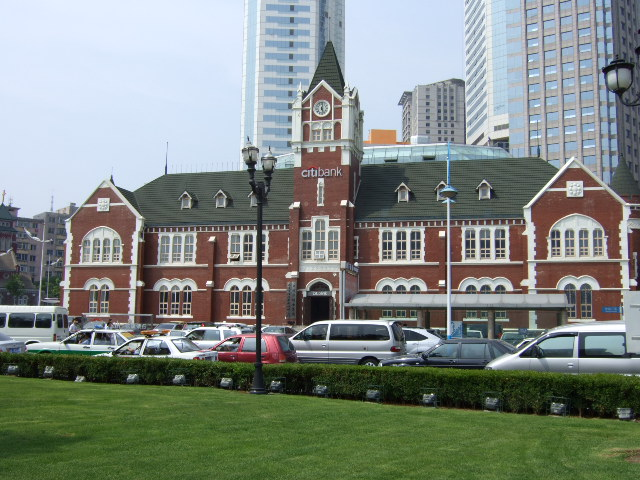
Citibank's Dalian Branch used to be Dalian Police Station, built in 1908.

The building at No. 2 Zhongshan Square, between Zhongshan Road and Yuguang Street, is now used as Citibank's Dalian Branch and other offices.

It was built in 1908 as Dalian Police Station (in Japanese: 大連民政署) which took care of both police and resident registration. It is the oldest building on this square and was designed by the team headed by Shoin Maeda (in Japanese: 前田松韻) of the Kwantung government, who later was invited to become professor at Tokyo High School of Technology, the predecessor of Tokyo Institute of Technology.

=== Dalian Financial Building ===
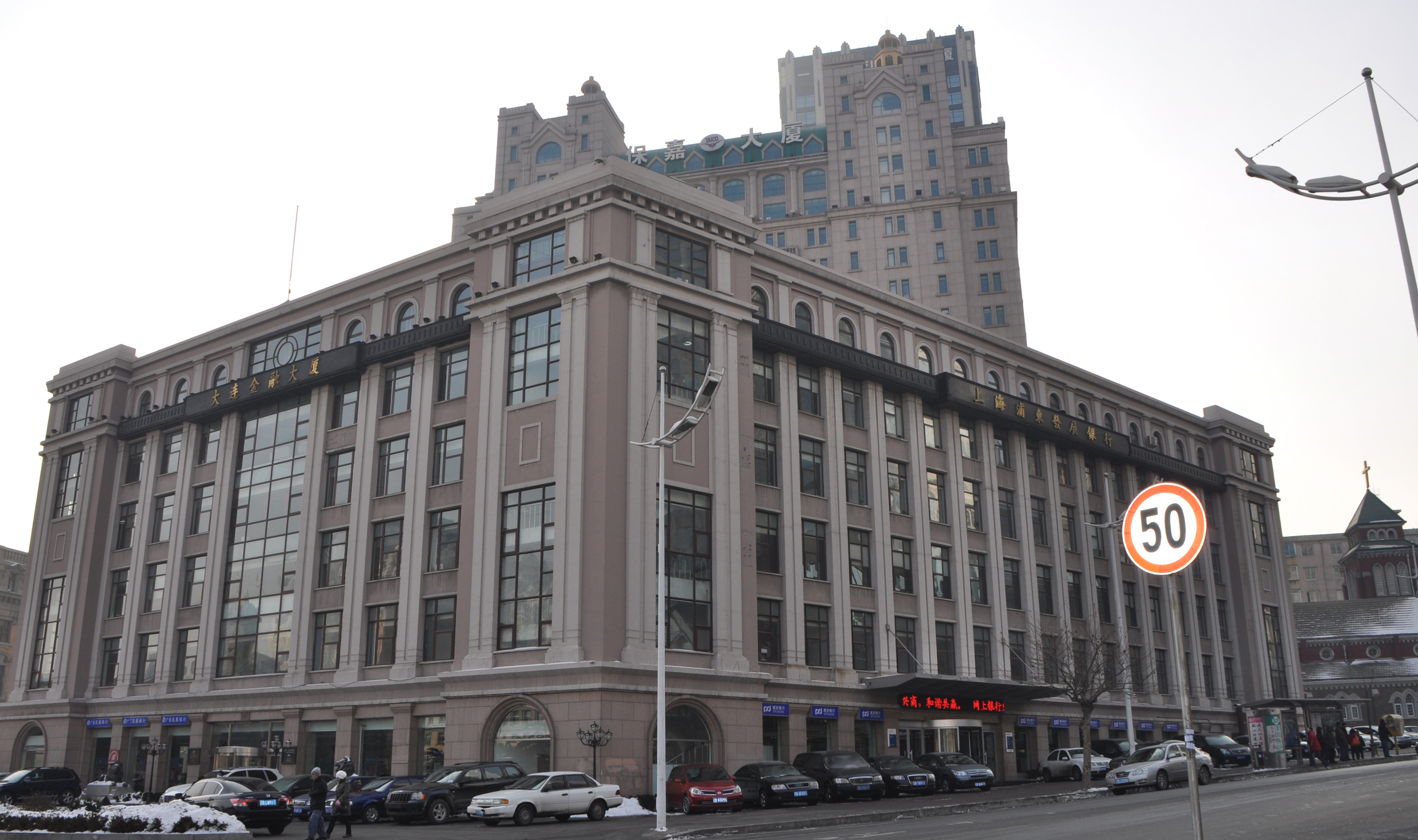
Dalian Financial Building, built in 2000, is the newest addition to the buildings on Zhongshan Square.

The new Postmodern architecture building at No. 3 Zhongshan Square, between Yuguang Street and Yan'an Road, is Dalian Financial Building (in Chinese: 大连金融大厦), built in 2000. Since 2001, it has been occupied by Shanghai Pudong Development Bank's Dalian Branch on the right side (on Yuguang Street) and Guangdong Development Bank's Dalian Branch on the left side (on Yan'an Road).

At this site stood the British Consulate General's building, completed in 1914 (Architect: H. Ashead). It was demolished in 1995.

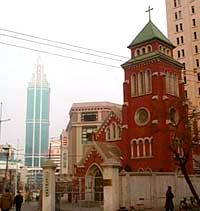
Yuguang Street Church was the former Anglican Church, built in 1928.

==== Note 1 ====
Adjacent to the Consulate General's office on the Yuguang Street side (No. 2 Yuguang Street) stood Dalian Anglican church, whose second generation red brick building, built in 1928 in a joint effort of the Church of England and Japanese Anglican Church, still remains there, used as Yuguang Street Church.

=== Dalian Hotel ===
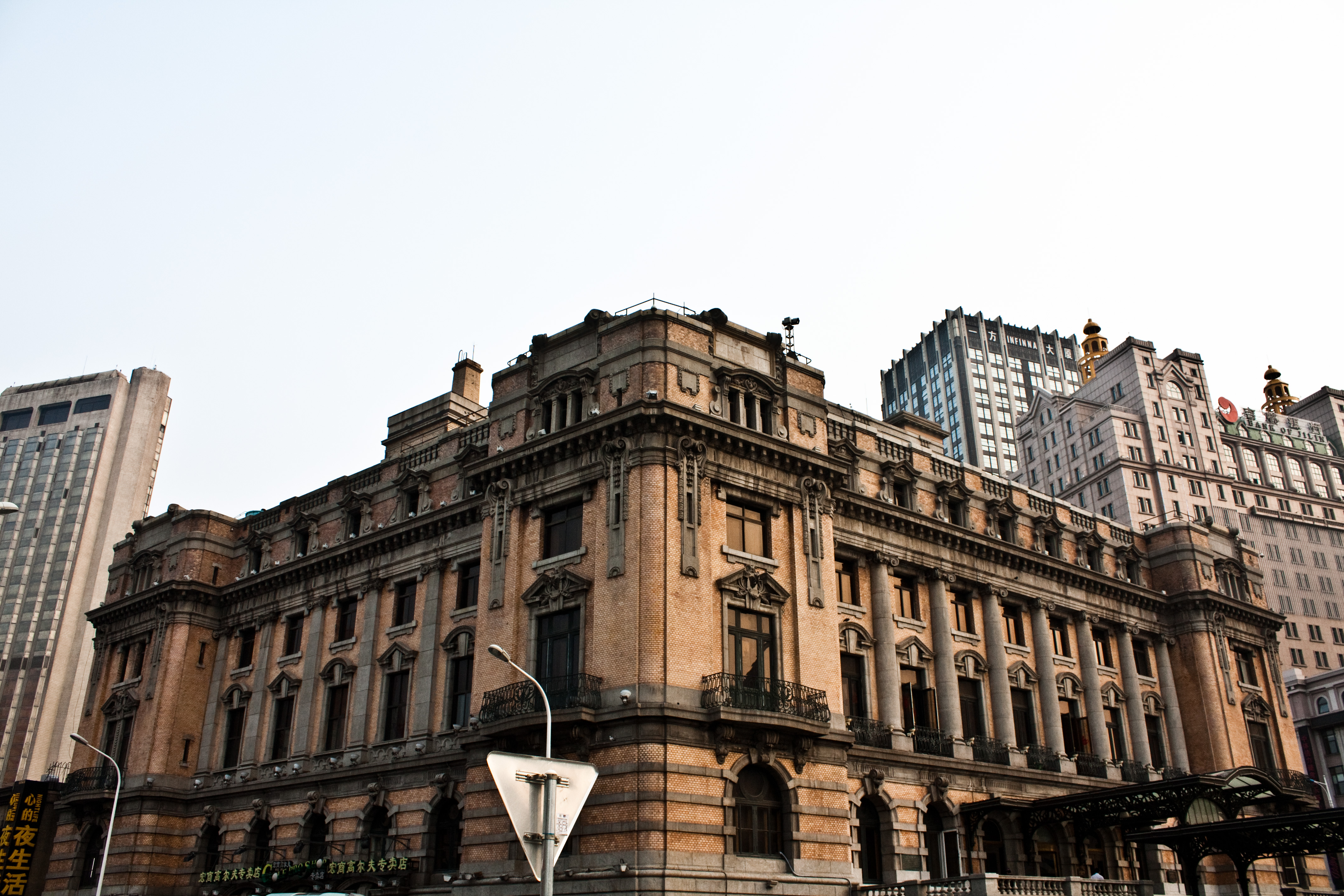
The Dalian Hotel used to be called Dalian Yamato Hotel, built in 1914

The 4-storey Renaissance architecture building with Ionic columns in front at No. 4 Zhongshan Square, between Yan'an Road and Jiefang Street, is now the Dalian Hotel.

It was built in 1914 as the Dalian Yamato Hotel (in Japanese: ヤマト旅館 or Chinese: 大和旅馆), owned by South Manchuria Railway.

=== Industrial and Commercial Bank of China #2 ===
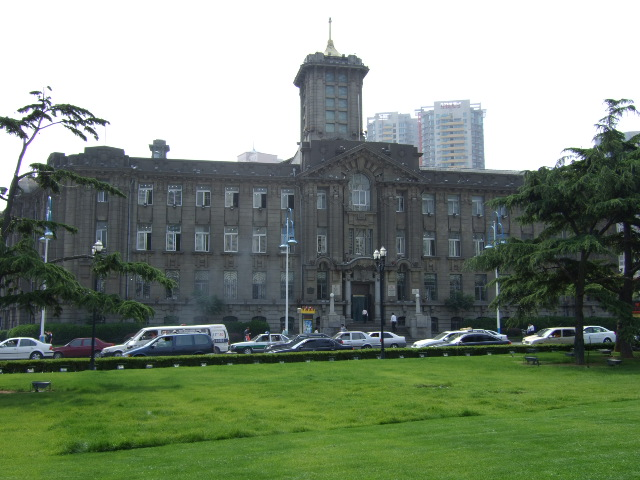
This Industrial and Commercial Bank of China's Dalian Branch used to be known as Dalian City Hall, built in 1919.

The building at No. 5 Zhongshan Square, between Jiefang Street and Luxun Road, is now Industrial and Commercial Bank of China's Dalian Branch (in Chinese: 中国工商银行大连分行).

It was built in 1919 as Dalian City Hall (in Japanese: 大連市役所) and was designed by the team headed by Shigemitsu Matsumuro (in Japanese: 松室重光) of the Kwantung government.

=== Bank of Communications ===
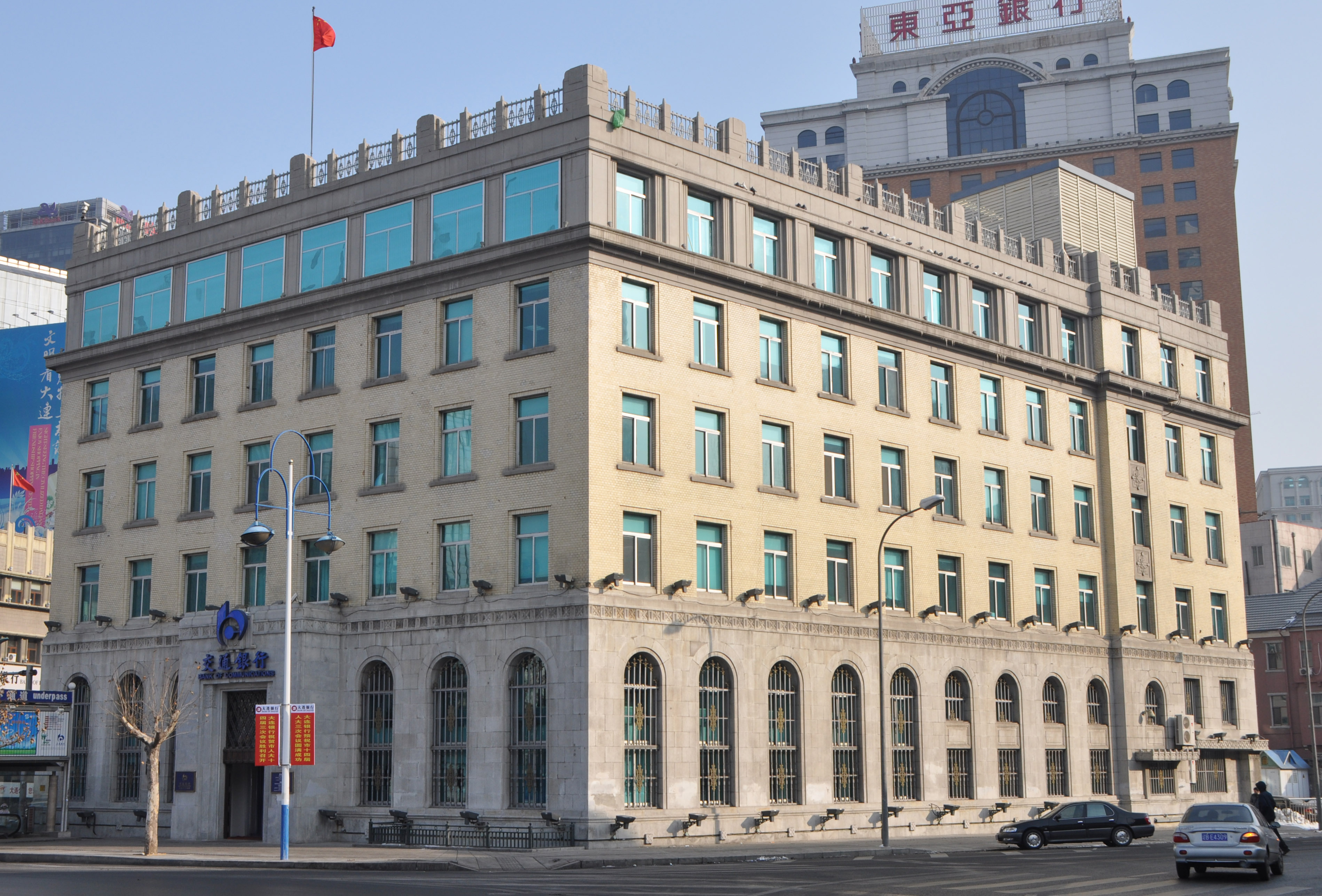
Bank of Communications' Dalian Branch used to be Orient Development Company's Dalian Branch.

The Art Deco building at No. 6 Zhongshan Square, between Luxun and Renmin Roads, is now Bank of Communications' Dalian Branch.

It was built in 1936, under the design of Shuichi Munetaka, as Dalian Branch of Oriental Development Company (in Japanese: 東洋拓殖), Japan's state-owned enterprise, that had branches in Korea and China.

=== China CITIC Bank ===
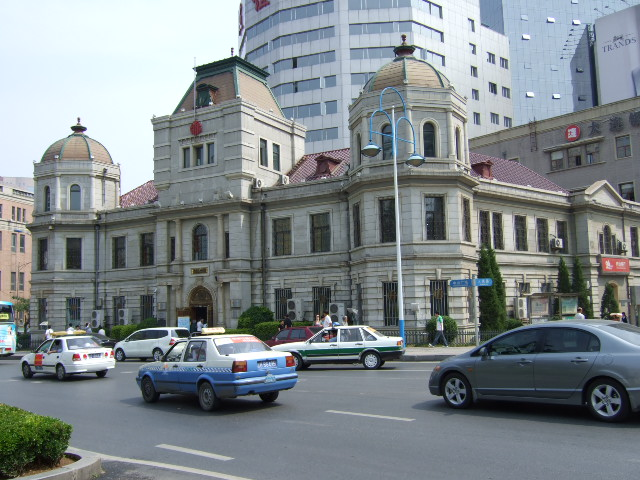
China CITIC Bank's Dalian Branch used to be Dalian Branch of Daqing Bank.

The French-style Renaissance architecture building at No. 7 Zhongshan Square, between Renmin Road and Qiyi Street, is now China CITIC Bank (Chinese: 中信银行).

It was built in 1910 as Dalian Branch of Daqing Bank (in Chinese: 大清银行).

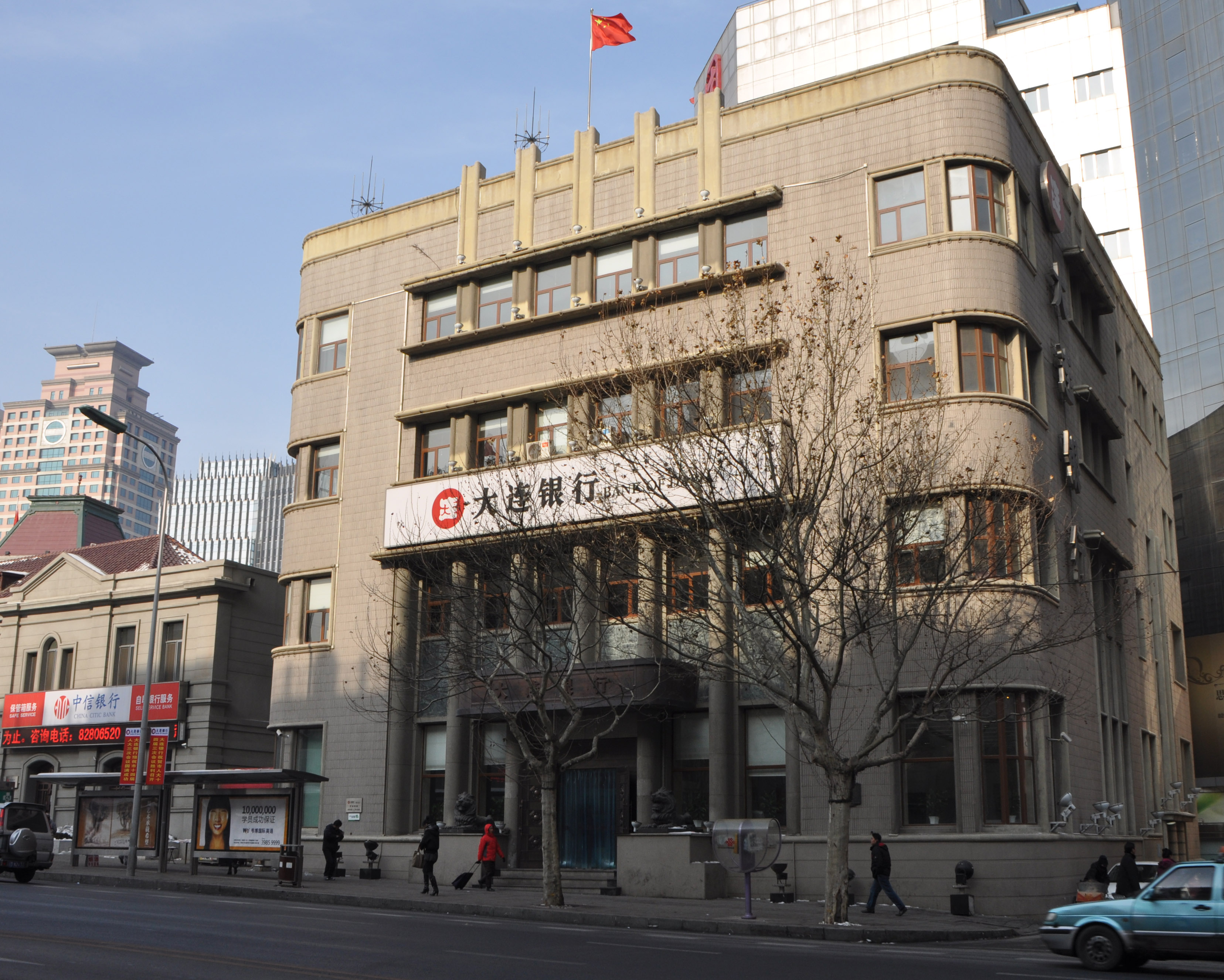
Bank of Dalian - Zhongshan Square Branch

==== Note 2 ====
Adjacent to this building on the Renmin Road side (No. 6 Renmin Road) is Zhongshan Square Branch of Bank of Dalian (in Chinese: 大连银行). It was formerly the Dalian Branch of Bank of Taiwan (in Japanese: 台湾銀行), built in 1910.

=== Dalian People's Culture Club ===
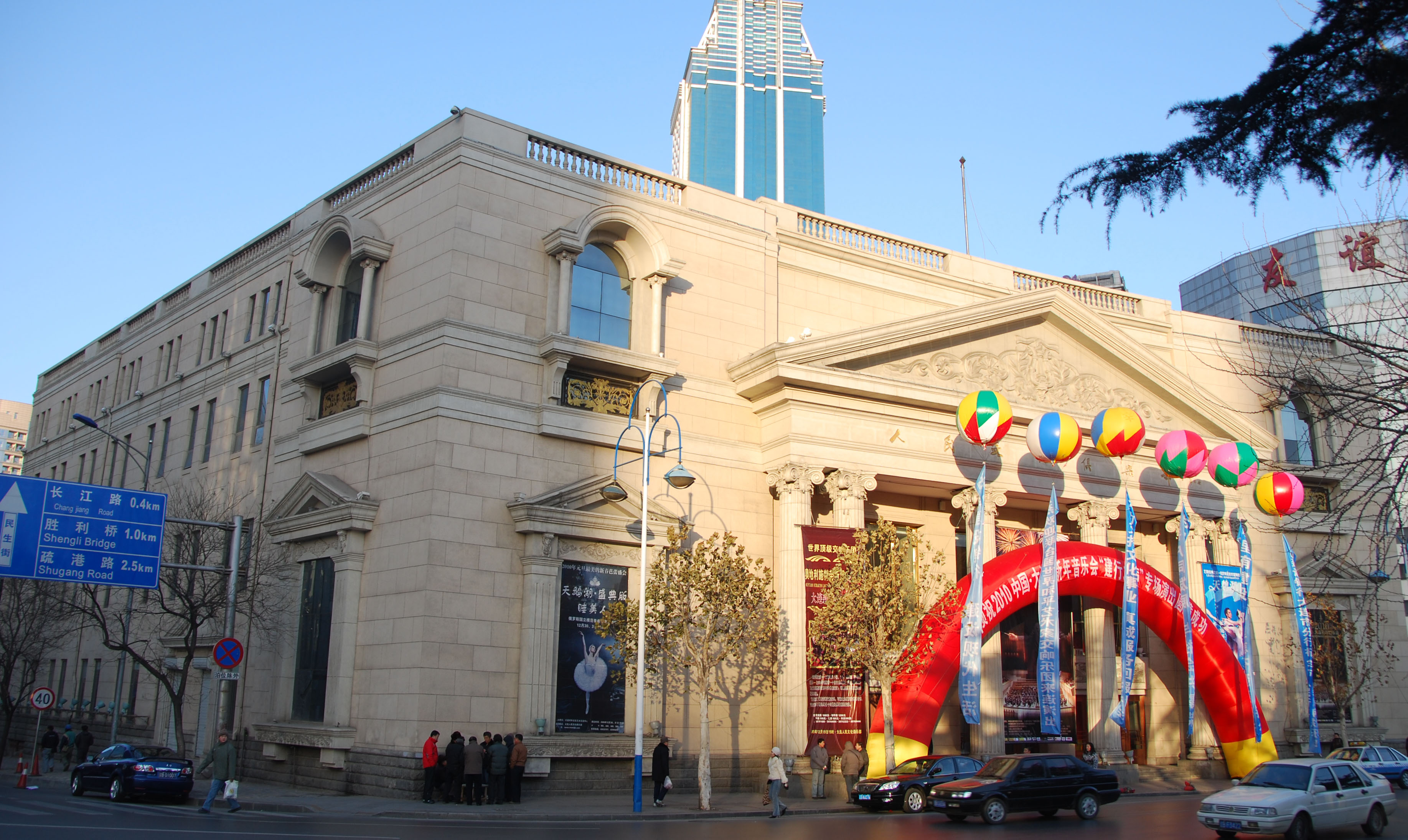
Dalian People's Culture Club, built in 1951, under the design of a Soviet team.

The building at No. 8 Zhongshan Square, between Qiyi and Minsheng Streets, is Dalian People's Culture Club (in Chinese: 大连文化俱乐部), built in 1951 by the Soviet architecture team led by a Belorussian engineer. It has been the center of music and other cultural activities for the Dalianese people.

=== Bank of China ===
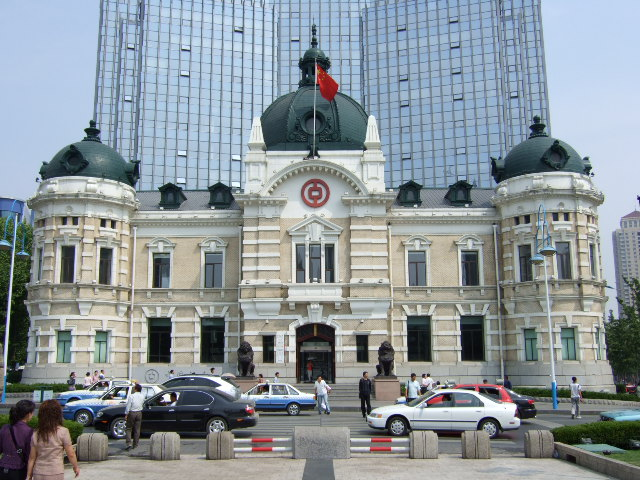
Bank of China's Dalian Branch

The colorful building at No. 9 Zhongshan Square, between Minsheng Street and Shanghai Road, is now Bank of China's Dalian Branch, together with the new main building on the back side, added in 2005, where the bank transactions are done mostly.

It was built in 1909 as Dalian Branch of Yokohama Specie Bank (in Japanese: 横浜正金銀行), designed by Tsumaki Yorinaka (in Japanese: 妻木頼黄) and his disciple, Satoshi Ōta (Japanese: 太田毅). It was used as the Soviet Union's Far East Bank from 1945 to 1955. The building's interior was massively changed in the 2005 renovation.

=== Dalian Post Office ===
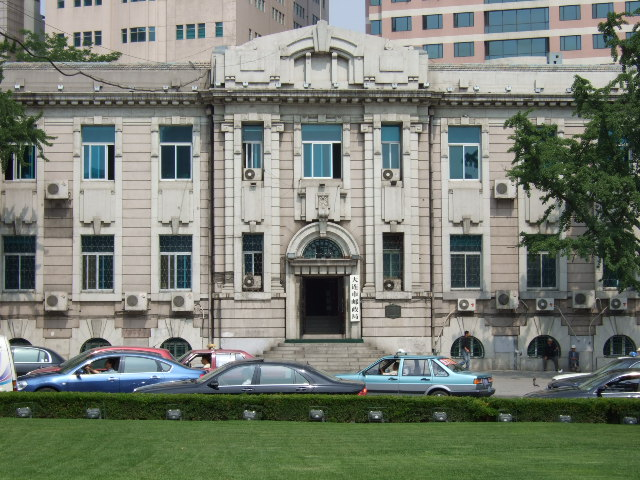
Dalian Post office

The building at No. 10 Zhongshan Square, between Shanghai Road and Minkang Street, is now used as part of Dalian Post Office, whose main office is on Chanjiang Road in front of Dalian Railway Station.

It was built in December, 1917, as Kwantung Bureau of Communications (in Japanese: 关东逓信局) and was designed by the team headed by Shigemitsu Matsumuro of Kwantung government.

== Protection by the State and Local Governments ==
All these buildings, except Dalian Financial Building and the buildings written in the Notes, were declared in 2001:

- The Major Site Protected at the National Level

All buildings were designated in 2002:

- The "Heritage Buildings under Protection by the Dalian Municipal Government" (in Chinese: 大连市重点保护建筑)

== See also ==
- Dalian
- Russian Dalian
- Zhongshan Square (Dalian)
- The Bund (Shanghai)#Architecture and buildings
