= Renmin Road Subdistrict, Dalian =

Renmin Road Subdistrict 人民路街道
- Subdistrict
- Location in Liaoning
- Coordinates: 38°55′19″N 121°39′12″E
- Country: China
- Province: Liaoning
- Prefecture-level city: Dalian
- District: Zhongshan District
- Time zone: UTC+8 (China Standard Time)

Renmin Road Subdistrict (Chinese: 人民路街道; pinyin: Rénmínlù Jiēdào) is a subdistrict situated in Zhongshan District, Dalian, Liaoning, China. As of 2020, it administers the following 12 residential communities:

Communities:

- Fushou Community (福寿社区)
- Xinghe Community (兴和社区)
- Qiyi Community (七一社区)
- Xiuzhu Community (修竹社区)
- Haigang Community (海港社区)
- Minzhu Community (民主社区)
- Gangxing Community (港兴社区)
- Gangsheng Community (港盛社区)
- Zhucui Community (珠翠社区)
- Dongri Community (东日社区)
- Zhujin Community (珠锦社区)
- Gangyun Community (港韵社区)

== See also ==
- List of township-level divisions of Liaoning
