= 1912 Mürefte earthquake =

Earthquake struck the Sea of Marmara, Turkey on August 9, 1912

- Location within Marmara
- UTC time: 1912-08-09 01:29:03
- ISC event
- USGS-ANSS: ComCat
- Local date: 9 August 1912
- Local time: 03:29
- Magnitude: 7.4 M_{w}
- Depth: 15 km
- Epicenter: 40.70°N 27.20°E
- Areas affected: Turkey
- Max. intensity: MMI X (Extreme)
- Tsunami: 2.7 m (8 ft 10 in)
- Casualties: 216–3,000

The 1912 Mürefte earthquake occurred at 03:29 local time on 9 August. It had an estimated magnitude of 7.4 M_{w} and a maximum intensity of X (Extreme) on the Modified Mercalli intensity scale, causing from 216 to 3,000 casualties.

== Earthquake ==
The earthquake was associated with faulting along the Ganos Fault, a segment of the North Anatolian Fault. Geologic trenching revealed coseismic offsets occurred along the entire 45 km (28 mi) onshort section of the Ganos Fault. These right-lateral displacements reached up to 5.5 m (18 ft). For its surface-wave magnitude (M_{s} 7.3–7.4), its corresponding rupture length would be approximately 135 ± 25 km (84 ± 16 mi). This implied the offshore segments east and west of the onshore Ganos Fault also ruptured. In the Marmara Sea, young fault scarps and right-lateral offsets up to 6 m (20 ft) were found. West of the Ganos Fault is the Saros Fault that lies beneath a bay; estimates of the Saros Fault rupture are between 20 km (12 mi) and 50 km (31 mi). Meanwhile, another 30–60 km (19–37 mi) of rupture may have extended eastwards into the Marmara Sea.

== Tsunami ==
A tsunami was associated with undersea landslides that triggered waves up to 2.7 m (8 ft 10 in) high. Evidence of landslides from the 1912 event was found at the southern edge of the Tekirdağ Basin. In the Bosporus Strait, the tsunami destroyed a yacht located at Paşabahçe.

== See also ==
- List of earthquakes in 1912
- List of earthquakes in Turkey
