= Handa Red Brick Building =

Coordinates: 34°54′5.87″N 136°55′42.15″E

- 半田赤レンガ建物
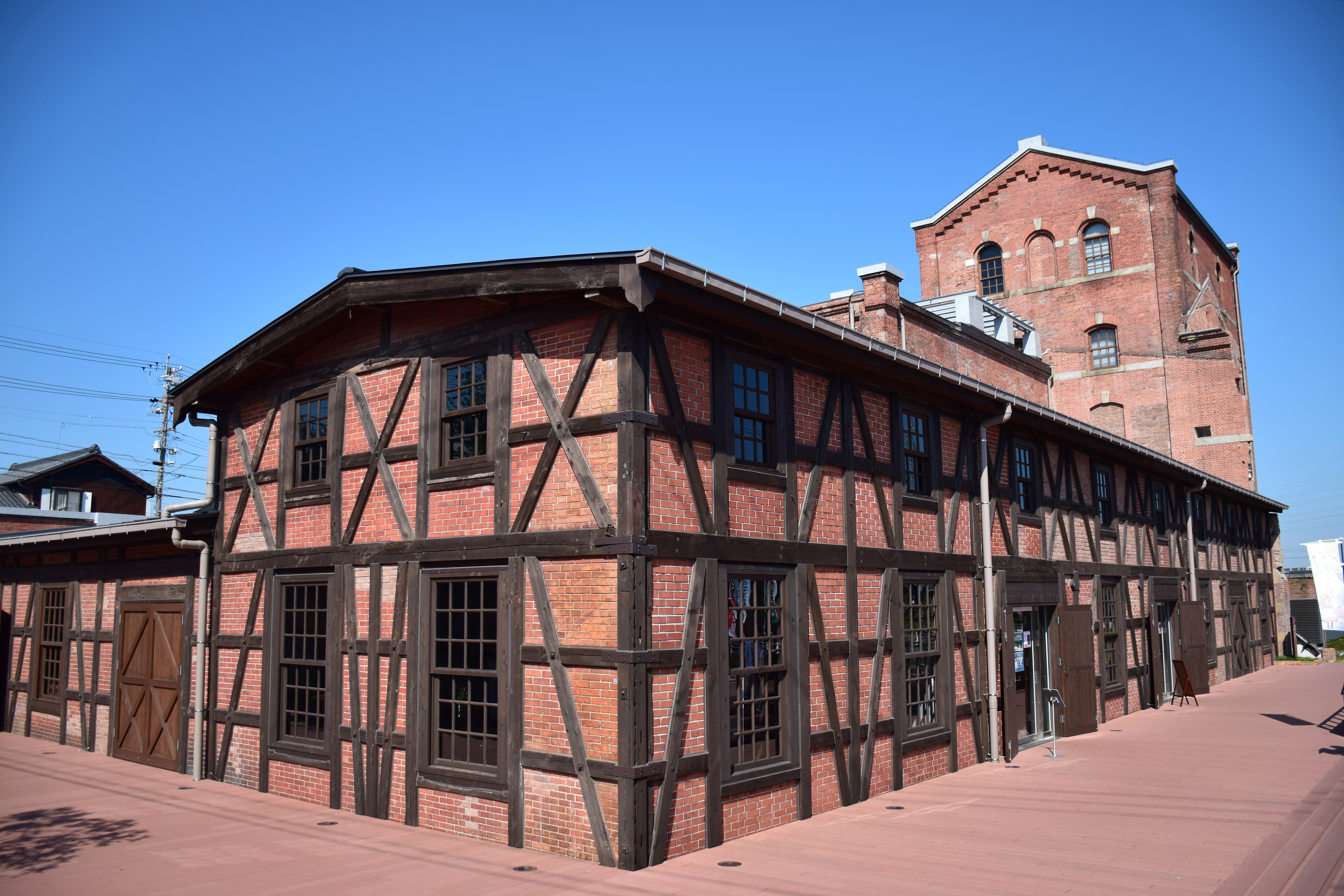
- Interactive map of the Handa Red Brick Building area
- Former names: Kabuto Beer Handa Factory Nihon Shokuhin Kako Handa Factory

General information
- Location: 8 Enokishita-cho, Handa City, Aichi Prefecture
- Construction started: September 1, 1897
- Construction stopped: October 31, 1898

Technical details
- Structural system: Brick construction (British masonry, some lengthwise masonry)
- Floor area: 6983 m²
- Grounds: 33787 m²

Design and construction
- Architect: Germania Maschinenfabrik Tsumaki Yorinaka

The Handa Red Brick Building (半田赤レンガ建物, Handa Akarenga Tatemono) is a historic brick warehouse located in Handa City, Aichi Prefecture, Japan. It is certified by the Ministry of Economy, Trade and Industry of Japan as one of the Heritage of Industrial Modernization of Japan sites and plaque locations. The site consists of three buildings: the original main building, a storage building, and a half-timbered building. Before renovations, the inside of the building was open to the public several times a year, but seismic reinforcement work and refurbishing was carried out between 2014 and 2015. Since July 18, 2015, it has been open to the public at all times (excluding New Year's Eve and New Year's Day).

== Details ==
The building was designed by architect Tsumaki Yorinaka, who worked on other industrial projects including the Yokohama Red Brick Warehouse. The building was made of about 2,400,000 red bricks, constructed in a British method.

== History ==
In 1898, the building was constructed as a beer factory for Marusan Beer, before it became Kabuto Beer. However, the brewery's operation was shut down in 1943. In 1944, during World War II, it became a clothing warehouse for the Nakajima Aircraft Company. During this period, the build was damaged by aircraft gunfire, which remains as of 2025. After the war, the building was used as a part of a corn starch manufacturing plant.

=== Movement for Preservation of Red Brick Buildings ===
In 1994, the factory was closed and set to be sold. However, no deals were made, and the building was eventually planned to be demolished in 1995. On March 19, 1996, Handa City signed an agreement to purchase approximately 34,000 m² of the former Nihon Shokuhin Kako factory site for approximately ¥3.047 billion yen.

In August 1997, Baba Nobuo and others formed a citizens' group called the Handa Red Brick Club (半田赤レンガ倶楽部), now called the Red Brick Club General Incorporated Association of Handa (一般社団法人赤煉瓦倶楽部半田).

In August 2002, Handa City and the Handa Red Brick Club opened the red brick building to the public for the first time. 8,600 people attended the two-day event.

On July 23, 2004, the three buildings (the half-timber building, the main building, and the storage building) were registered as tangible cultural properties of Japan, and on February 23, 2009, they were recognized by the Ministry of Economy, Trade and Industry as a Heritage of Industrial Modernization site.

=== Renewal Opening ===
Renovation work began in 2014, and the facility reopened as a tourist facility on July 18, 2015. Since its opening, JTB Promotion Inc. has managed and operated the facility, but Toyota Enterprise Corporation has been the designated manager since April 2020.

The building was hit by the 1944 Tōnankai Earthquake, the 1945 Mikawa Earthquake, and the Handa Air Raid, but it has remained intact to this day, and the scars from machine gun fire from P-51 fighter planes during the Handa Air Raid can still be seen on its walls.

In March 2022, a building was constructed that is a full-scale reproduction of the Kabuto Beer billboard, approximately 10m tall, that stood at Nagoya Station during the Meiji period. The old advertising tower in Nagoya was featured in the Ghibli film The Wind Rises and was built by the city to attract tourists before the opening of Ghibli Park.

== Gallery ==
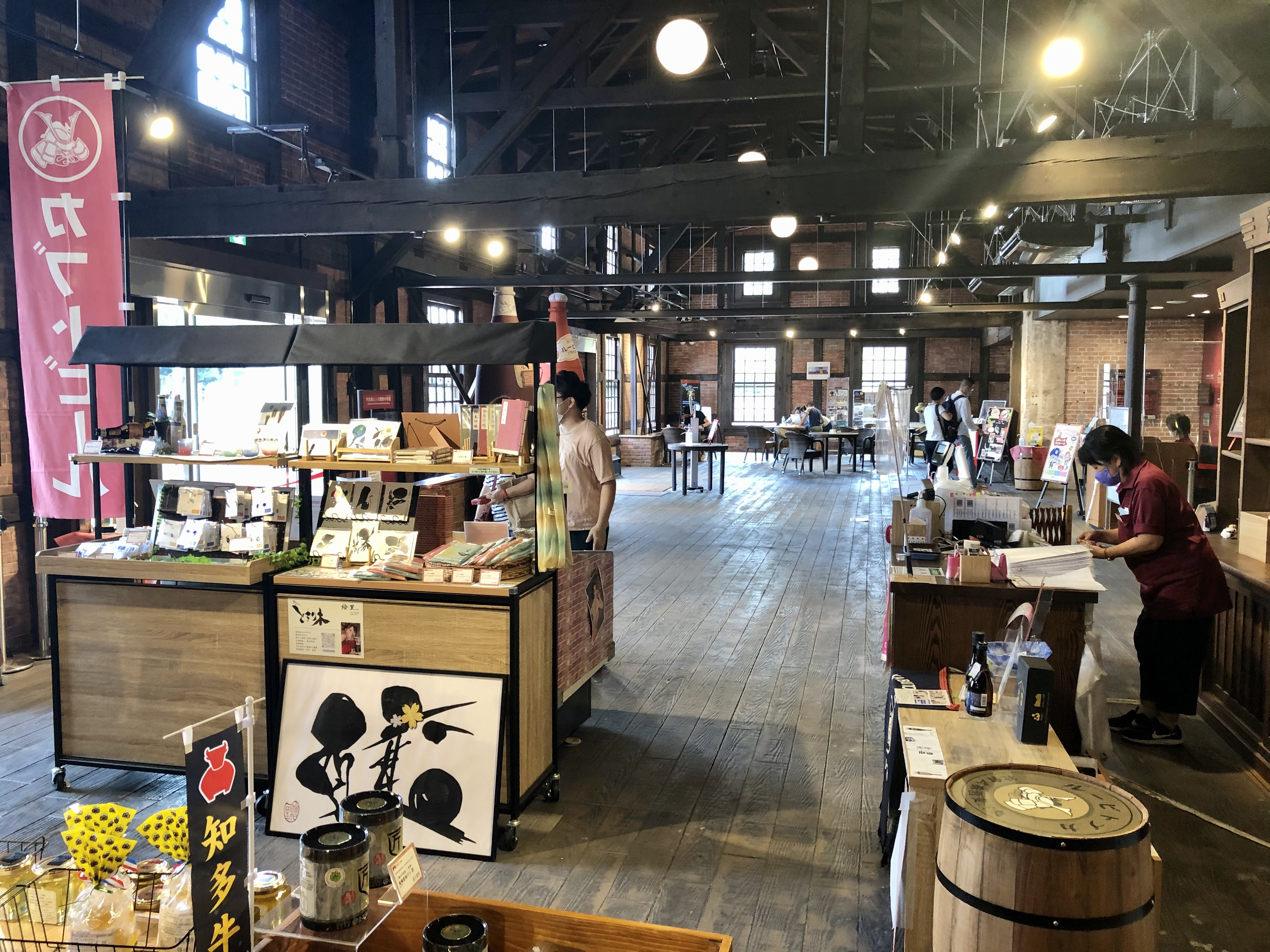
Shop

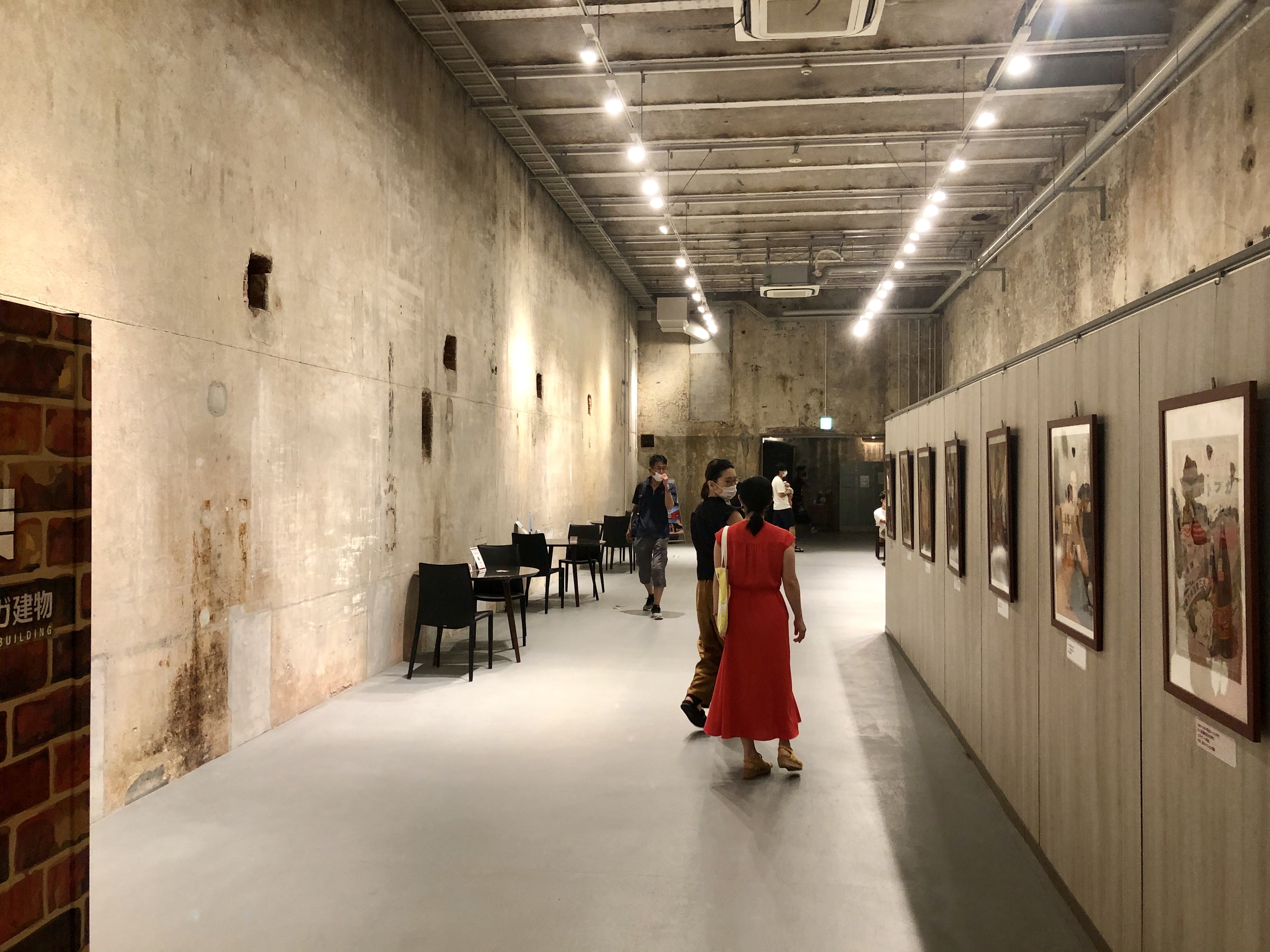
Common-use salon

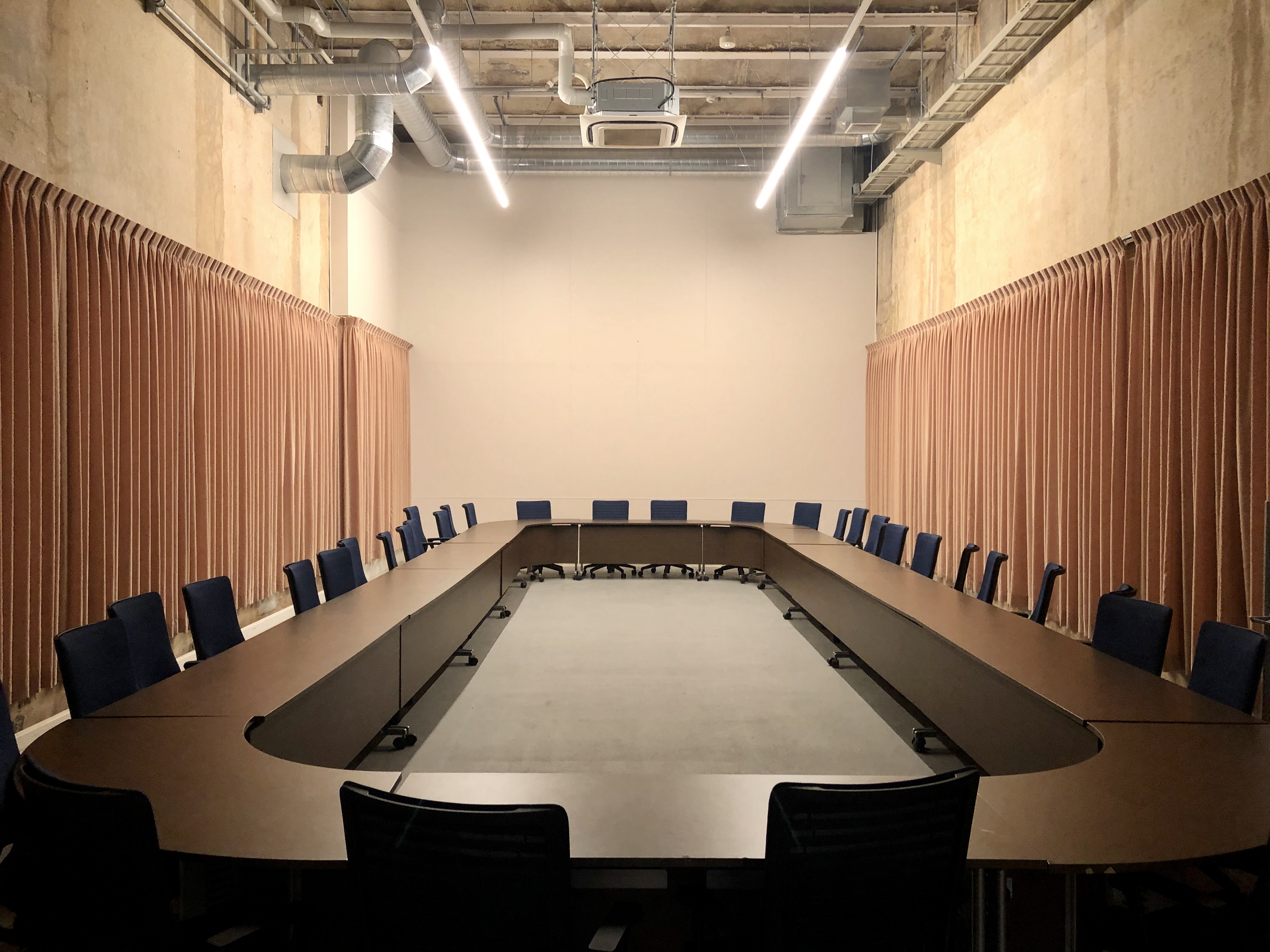
Clubhouse

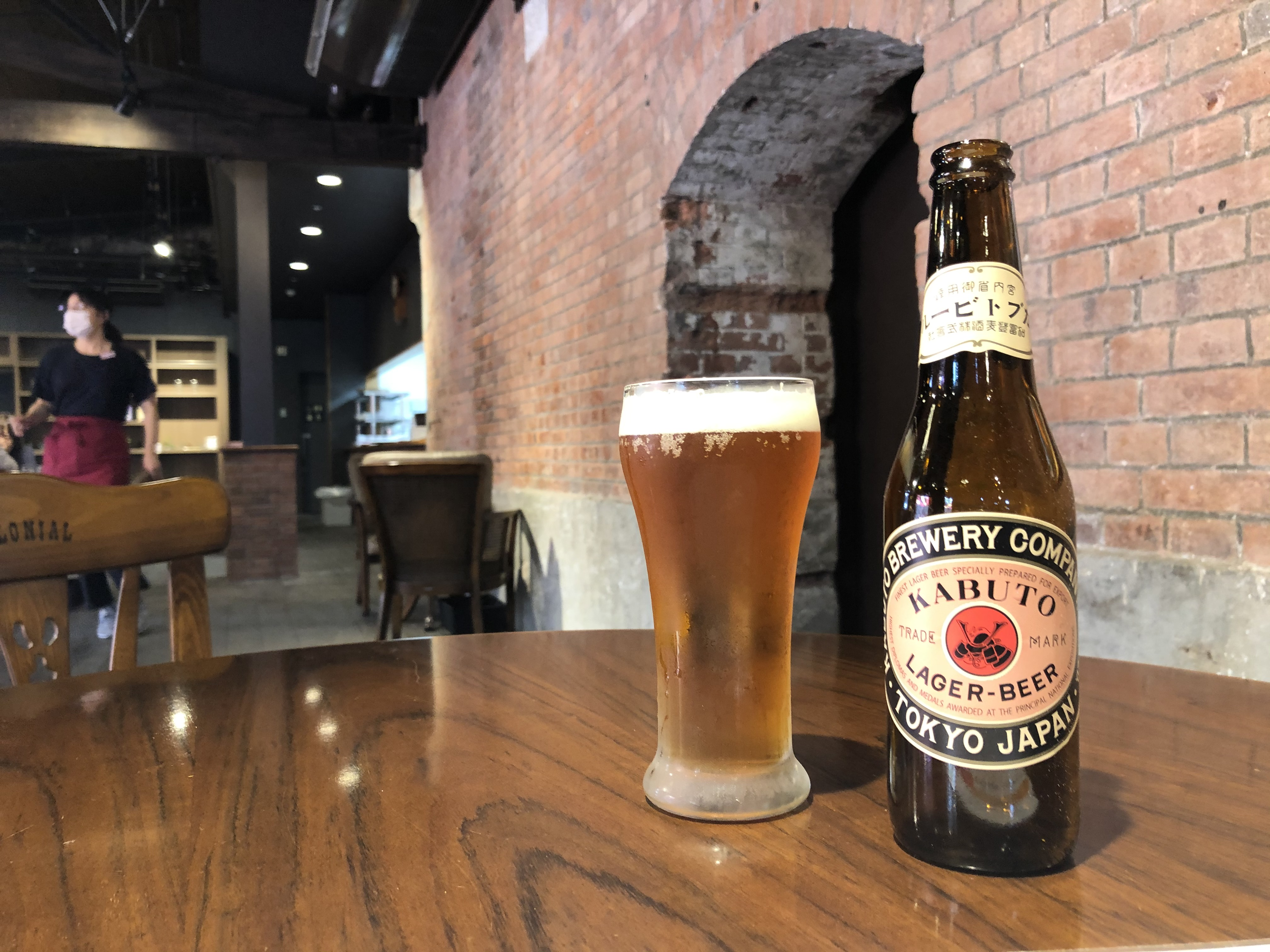
Reprint served at beer hall

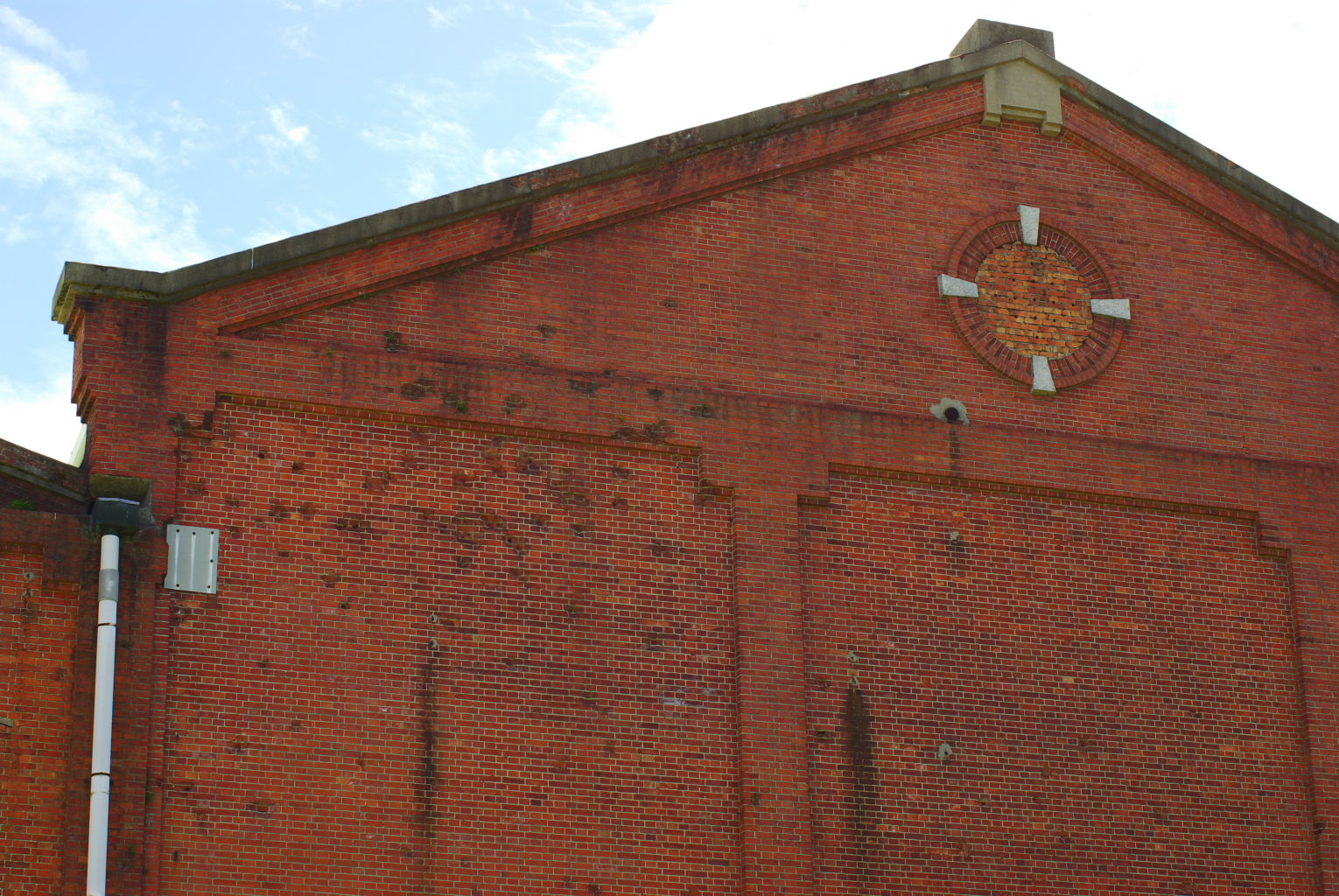
Machine gun fire left marks on the north side of the building (left of image).

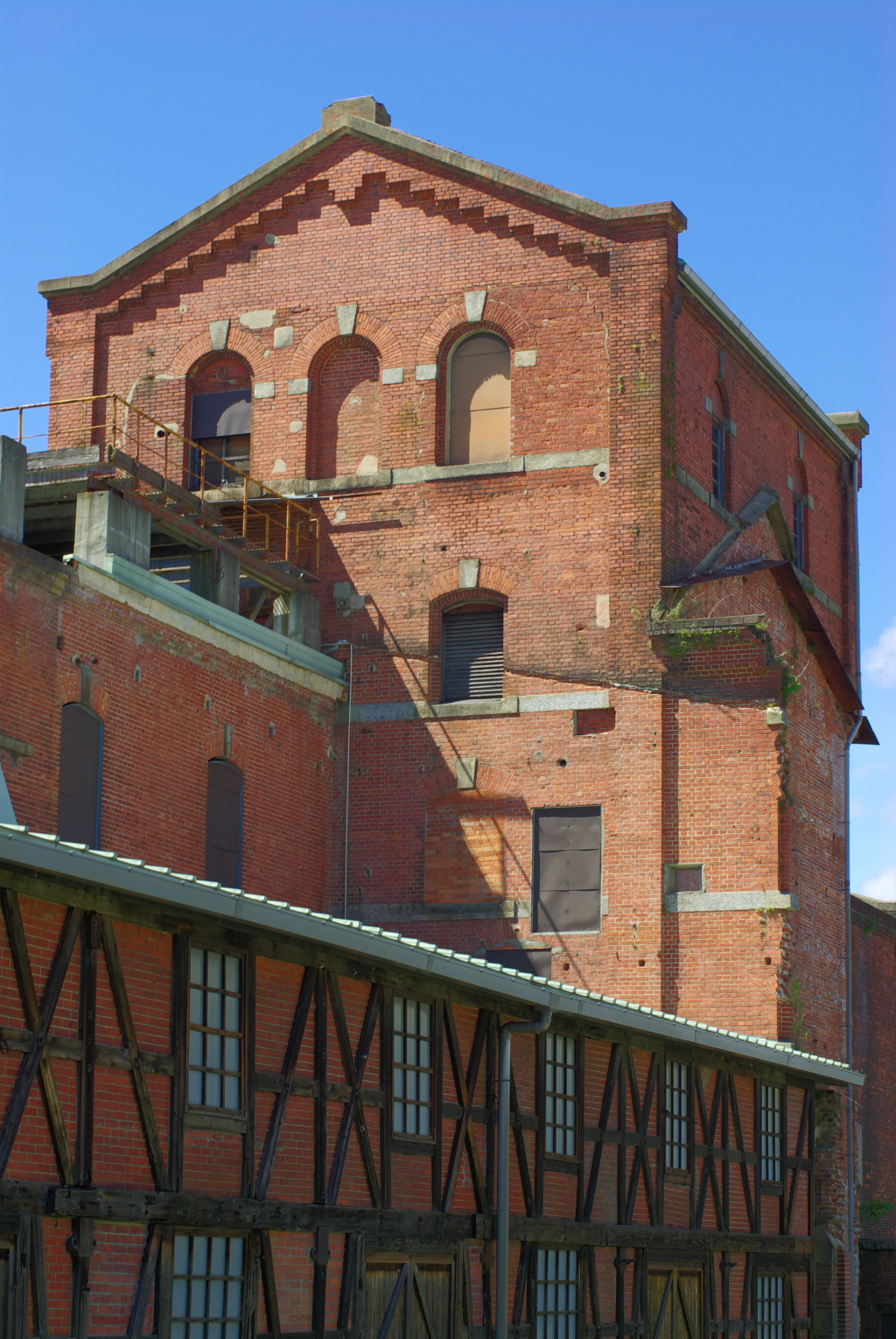
Steeple section

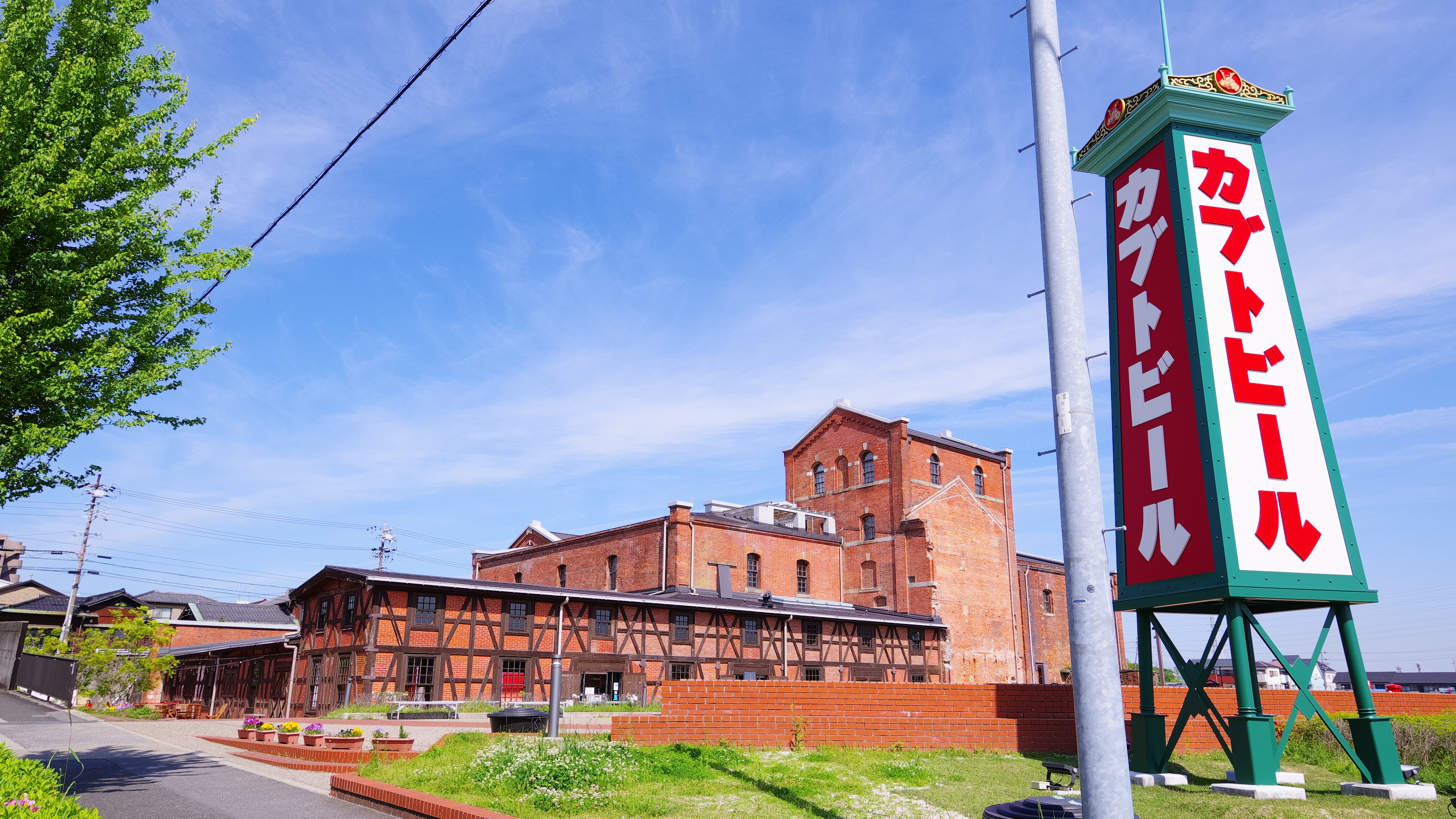
Kabuto beer advertising tower and red brick building

== Facility ==
The following facilities were newly established with the reopening.

- Permanent exhibition room
  - Introduces the Handa red brick building and the history of Kabuto Beer.
- Special exhibition room
- Re-BRICK
  - In addition to serving snacks and draft Kabuto beer made with ingredients from the Chita Peninsula, specialty products are also on sale.
  - Renewed from “Cafe Brick Shop” in June 2020.
- Clubhouse
  - There are four rooms A-D, which are used as studios and places for music performances.
- Marche Square
- Lawn Square

== In popular culture ==
- Handa Red Brick was used as a model location in the third episode of the anime series Violet Evergarden.

== Transit access ==
- Approximately 5 minutes on foot from Sumiyoshicho Station on the Meitetsu Kowa Line.
- About 15 minutes on foot from Handa Station on the JR Taketoyo Line.

== See also ==
- Handa, Aichi
- Yokohama Red Brick Warehouse
