= Kuiying Subdistrict =

Kuiying Subdistrict 葵英街道
- Subdistrict
- Location in Liaoning
- Coordinates: 38°53′57″N 121°38′30″E
- Country: People's Republic of China
- Province: Liaoning
- Prefecture-level city: Dalian
- District: Zhongshan District
- Time zone: UTC+8 (China Standard)

Kuiying Subdistrict (Chinese: 葵英街道; pinyin: Kuíyīng Jiēdào) is a subdistrict in Zhongshan District, Dalian, Liaoning, China. As of 2020, it has 14 residential communities under its administration:

Communities:

- Xiangyang Community (向阳社区)
- Shikui Community (石葵社区)
- Qingquan Community (清泉社区)
- Qingyun Community (青云社区)
- Guanghua Community (光华社区)
- Wenhua Community (文化社区)
- Kuiying Community (葵英社区)
- Zhiren Community (智仁社区)
- Linhai Community (林海社区)
- Wuhan Community (武汉社区)
- Duli Community (独立社区)
- Huachang Community (华昌社区)
- Lüshan Community (绿山社区)
- Wuchang Community (武昌社区)

In 2019, Kunming Subdistrict (昆明街道) was abolished, its former administrative area merged into Kuiying Subdistrict.

== See also ==
- List of township-level divisions of Liaoning
