= List of earthquakes in 1912 =

Earthquakes in 1912
Approximate epicenters of the earthquakes in 1912
- 4.0–5.9 magnitude
- 6.0–6.9 magnitude
- 7.0–7.9 magnitude
- 8.0+ magnitude
- Strongest magnitude: 2 events reached magnitude 7.5
- Deadliest: Ottoman Empire, Tekirdağ Province August 9 (Magnitude 7.1) 3,000 deaths
- Total fatalities: 3,153

Number by magnitude
- 9.0+: 0

This is a list of earthquakes in 1912. Only magnitude 6.0 or greater earthquakes appear on the list. Lower magnitude events are included if they have caused death, injury or damage. Events which occurred in remote areas will be excluded from the list as they wouldn't have generated significant media interest. All dates are listed according to UTC time. Turkey had an event in August which resulted in 3,000 deaths.

== Overall ==
=== By death toll ===
Rank	Death toll	Magnitude	Location	MMI	Depth (km)	Date
1	3,000	7.1	Ottoman Empire, Tekirdağ Province	( )	15.0	August 9
2	140	6.9	Mexico, State of Mexico	X (Extreme)	15.0	November 19
3	101	7.0	Peru, Piura Region	X (Extreme)	0.0	July 24
4	51	6.5	Greece, Zakynthos	X (Extreme)	15.0	January 24

- Note: At least 10 casualties

=== By magnitude ===
Rank	Magnitude	Death toll	Location	MMI	Depth (km)	Date
= 1	7.5	1	British Raj, Shan State	IX (Violent)	15.0	May 23
= 1	7.5	0	German New Guinea, east of	( )	15.0	September 29
= 2	7.3	0	New Hebrides	( )	260.0	August 6
= 2	7.3	0	United States, west of Kodiak Island, Alaska	V (Moderate)	90.0	November 7
= 2	7.3	0	Argentina, Santiago del Estero Province	( )	620.0	December 7
= 3	7.2	0	United States, central Alaska	( )	0.0	July 7
= 3	7.2	0	Dutch East Indies, Talaud Islands	( )	0.0	August 17
= 4	7.1	3,000	Ottoman Empire, Tekirdağ Province	( )	15.0	August 9
= 4	7.1	0	Mexico, Chiapas	( )	0.0	December 9
= 5	7.0	0	United States, southern Alaska	( )	80.0	January 31
= 5	7.0	0	Denmark, Southern Region (Iceland)	XI (Extreme)	0.0	May 6
= 5	7.0	101	Peru, Piura Region	X (Extreme)	0.0	July 24
= 5	7.0	0	Australia, north of Bougainville Island	( )	430.0	September 1
= 5	7.0	0	(German Empire) Northern Mariana Islands, Rota (island)	( )	130.0	October 26

- Note: At least 7.0 magnitude

== Notable events ==
=== January ===
January
- Strongest magnitude: 7.0 M_{w} United States
- Deadliest: 6.5 M_{w} Greece; 51 deaths
- Total fatalities: 51+

Number by magnitude
- 8.0–8.9: 0
- 7.0–7.9: 1
- 6.0–6.9: 2

Date	Country and location	M_{w}	Depth (km)	MMI	Notes	Casualties	
Date	Country and location	M_{w}	Depth (km)	MMI	Notes	Dead	Injured
4	United States, Andreanof Islands, Alaska	6.7	25.0				
24	Greece, Zakynthos	6.5	15.0	X	At least 51 deaths were caused.	51	
31	United States, southern Alaska	7.0	80.0				

=== February ===
February
- Strongest magnitude: 6.0 M_{w} South Africa
- Total fatalities: 0

Number by magnitude
- 8.0–8.9: 0
- 7.0–7.9: 0
- 6.0–6.9: 1

Date	Country and location	M_{w}	Depth (km)	MMI	Notes	Casualties	
Date	Country and location	M_{w}	Depth (km)	MMI	Notes	Dead	Injured
20	South Africa, Orange Free State	6.0	35.0				

=== March ===
March
- Strongest magnitude: 6.9 M_{w} New Hebrides
- Total fatalities: 0

Number by magnitude
- 8.0–8.9: 0
- 7.0–7.9: 0
- 6.0–6.9: 2

Date	Country and location	M_{w}	Depth (km)	MMI	Notes	Casualties	
Date	Country and location	M_{w}	Depth (km)	MMI	Notes	Dead	Injured
11	Canada, south of Queen Charlotte Islands	6.5	35.0				
25	New Hebrides	6.9	240.0				

=== April ===
April
- Strongest magnitude: 6.6 M_{w} Afghanistan
- Total fatalities: 0

Number by magnitude
- 8.0–8.9: 0
- 7.0–7.9: 0
- 6.0–6.9: 1

Date	Country and location	M_{w}	Depth (km)	MMI	Notes	Casualties	
Date	Country and location	M_{w}	Depth (km)	MMI	Notes	Dead	Injured
25	Afghanistan, Badakshan Province	6.6	220.0				

=== May ===
May
- Strongest magnitude: 7.5 M_{w} (India) Myanmar
- Deadliest: 7.5 M_{w} (India) Myanmar; 1 death
- Total fatalities: 1+

Number by magnitude
- 8.0–8.9: 0
- 7.0–7.9: 2
- 6.0–6.9: 4

Date	Country and location	M_{w}	Depth (km)	MMI	Notes	Casualties	
Date	Country and location	M_{w}	Depth (km)	MMI	Notes	Dead	Injured
6	(Denmark) Iceland, Southern Region (Iceland)	7.0	0.0	XI	Depth unknown.		
13	Russian Empire, Kamchatka	6.6	100.0				
15	New Zealand, Kermadec Islands	6.5	250.0				
22	Afghanistan, Badakhshan Province	6.2	220.0				
23	(India) British Raj, Shan State	7.5	15.0	IX	The 1912 Maymyo earthquake killed 1 person and caused major damage.	1	
25	Kingdom of Romania, Vrancea County	6.0	100.0				

=== June ===
June
- Strongest magnitude: 6.9 M_{w} United States
- Total fatalities: 0

Number by magnitude
- 8.0–8.9: 0
- 7.0–7.9: 0
- 6.0–6.9: 6

Date	Country and location	M_{w}	Depth (km)	MMI	Notes	Casualties	
Date	Country and location	M_{w}	Depth (km)	MMI	Notes	Dead	Injured
1	Afghanistan, Badakhshan Province	6.0	200.0				
7	United States, Cook Inlet, Alaska	6.4	35.0		Foreshock.		
8	(Empire of Japan) Japan, off the east coast of Honshu	6.6	35.0		Some damage was caused as well as a small tsunami.		
10	United States, Cook Inlet, Alaska	6.9	0.0		Depth unknown.		
12	British Honduras, Cayo District	6.6	0.0		Depth unknown.		
14	Russian Empire, Sea of Okhotsk	6.5	500.0				

=== July ===
July
- Strongest magnitude: 7.2 M_{w} United States
- Deadliest: 7.0 M_{w} Peru; 101 deaths
- Total fatalities: 101+

Number by magnitude
- 8.0–8.9: 0
- 7.0–7.9: 2
- 6.0–6.9: 2

Date	Country and location	M_{w}	Depth (km)	MMI	Notes	Casualties	
Date	Country and location	M_{w}	Depth (km)	MMI	Notes	Dead	Injured
7	United States, central Alaska	7.2	0.0		Depth unknown.		
9	Uganda, Northern Region, Uganda	6.0	10.0				
24	Peru, Piura Region	7.0	0.0	X	At least 101 people were killed and another 101 were injured. Many homes were destroyed. Depth unknown.	101	101
24	Japan, Izu Islands	6.6	450.0				

=== August ===
August
- Strongest magnitude: 7.3 M_{w} New Hebrides
- Deadliest: 7.1 M_{w} Ottoman Empire, 3,000 deaths
- Total fatalities: 3,000

Number by magnitude
- 8.0–8.9: 0
- 7.0–7.9: 3
- 6.0–6.9: 2

Date	Country and location	M_{w}	Depth (km)	MMI	Notes	Casualties	
Date	Country and location	M_{w}	Depth (km)	MMI	Notes	Dead	Injured
6	New Hebrides	7.3	260.0				
9	Ottoman Empire, Tekirdağ Province	7.1	15.0		The 1912 Mürefte earthquake resulted in 3,000 deaths. Another 1,575 people were injured. 5,540 homes were destroyed.	3,000	1,575
17	Dutch East Indies, Talaud Islands	7.2	0.0		Depth unknown.		
18	Dutch East Indies, Banda Sea	6.5	650.0				
23	Afghanistan, Badakhshan Province	6.6	200.0				

=== September ===
September
- Strongest magnitude: 7.5 M_{w} (German Empire) Palau
- Total fatalities: 0

Number by magnitude
- 8.0–8.9: 0
- 7.0–7.9: 2
- 6.0–6.9: 1

Date	Country and location	M_{w}	Depth (km)	MMI	Notes	Casualties	
Date	Country and location	M_{w}	Depth (km)	MMI	Notes	Dead	Injured
1	German New Guinea, north of Bougainville Island	7.0	430.0				
11	Dutch East Indies, northern Sumatra	6.5	100.0				
29	(German Empire) Palau, east of	7.5	15.0				

=== October ===
October
- Strongest magnitude: 7.0 M_{w} (German Empire) Northern Mariana Islands
- Total fatalities: 0

Number by magnitude
- 8.0–8.9: 0
- 7.0–7.9: 1
- 6.0–6.9: 2

Date	Country and location	M_{w}	Depth (km)	MMI	Notes	Casualties	
Date	Country and location	M_{w}	Depth (km)	MMI	Notes	Dead	Injured
18	Bering Sea	6.9	60.0				
26	(German Empire) Northern Mariana Islands, Rota (island)	7.0	130.0				
31	(German Empire) Yap	6.9	0.0	III	Depth unknown.		

=== November ===
November
- Strongest magnitude: 7.3 M_{w} United States
- Deadliest: 6.9 M_{w} Mexico; 140 deaths
- Total fatalities: 140

Number by magnitude
- 8.0–8.9: 0
- 7.0–7.9: 1
- 6.0–6.9: 2

Date	Country and location	M_{w}	Depth (km)	MMI	Notes	Casualties	
Date	Country and location	M_{w}	Depth (km)	MMI	Notes	Dead	Injured
7	United States, west of Kodiak Island, Alaska	7.3	90.0	V			
19	Mexico, State of Mexico	6.9	15.0	X	The 1912 Acambay earthquake caused serious destruction in central Mexico and killed at least 140 people.	140	
28	Afghanistan, Badakhshan Province	6.5	230.0				

=== December ===
December
- Strongest magnitude: 7.3 M_{w} Argentina
- Total fatalities: 0

Number by magnitude
- 8.0–8.9: 0
- 7.0–7.9: 2
- 6.0–6.9: 4

Date	Country and location	M_{w}	Depth (km)	MMI	Notes	Casualties	
Date	Country and location	M_{w}	Depth (km)	MMI	Notes	Dead	Injured
5	United States, Kodiak Island, Alaska	6.9	90.0				
7	Argentina, Santiago del Estero Province	7.3	620.0				
8	Empire of Japan, off the east coast of Honshu	6.6	35.0				
9	Mexico, Chiapas	7.1	0.0		Depth unknown.		
23	Dutch East Indies, Gulf of Tomini, Sulawesi	6.7	50.0				
24	(Empire of Japan) Taiwan, Hualien City	6.5	0.0		Depth unknown.		
