= Zhongshan, Dalian =

Zhongshan 中山区
- District
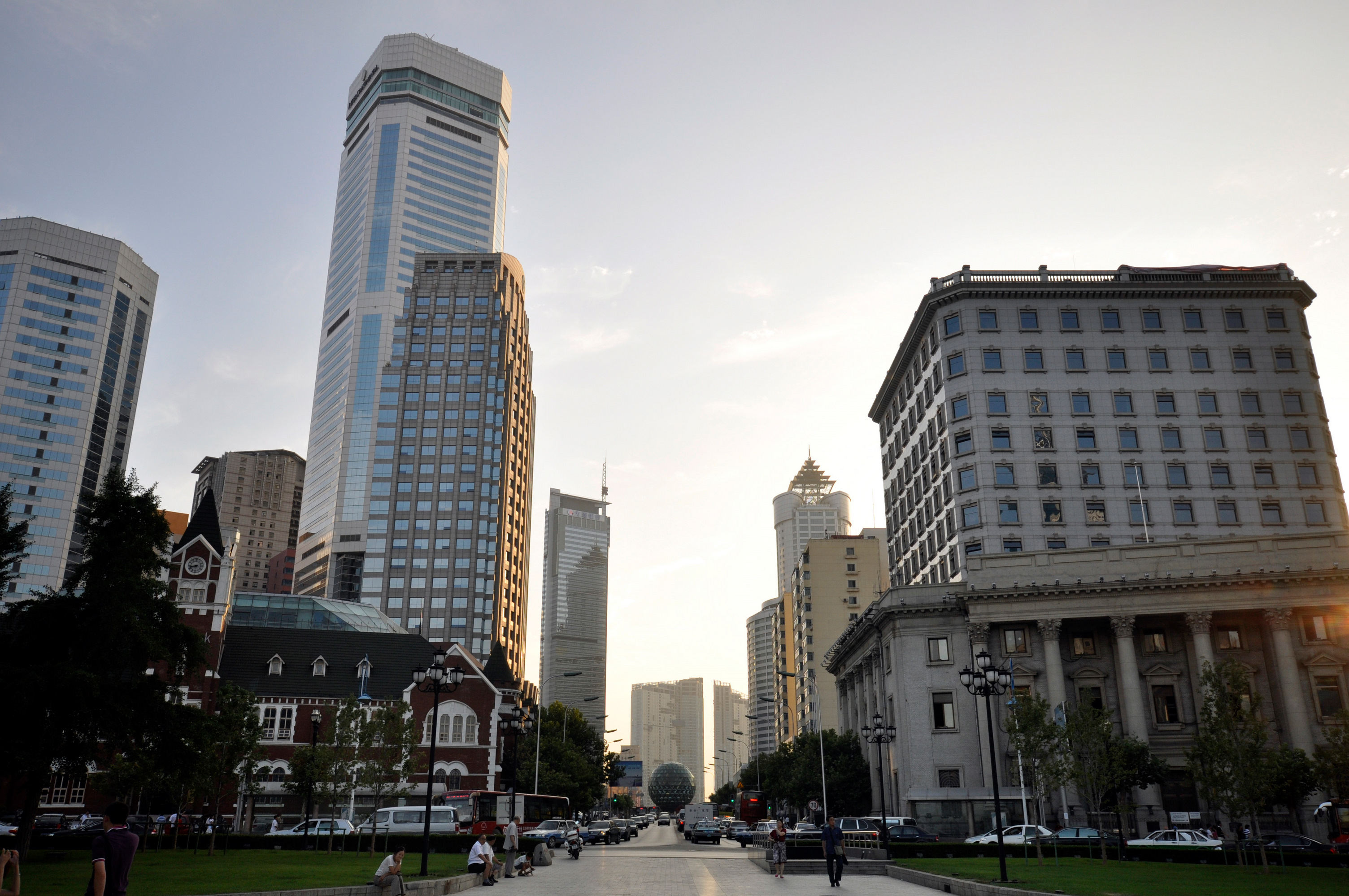

- Location in Liaoning
- Coordinates: 38°55′00″N 121°39′05″E
- Country: People's Republic of China
- Province: Liaoning
- Sub-provincial city: Dalian
- Seat: No. 83 Yide Street (一德街83号)

Area
  - Total: 40.10 km^{2} (15.48 sq mi)

Population (2010)
  - Total: 339,527
  - Density: 8,467/km^{2} (21,930/sq mi)
- Time zone: UTC+8 (China Standard)
- Division code: 210202
- Website: www.dlzs.gov.cn

Zhongshan, Dalian
- Simplified Chinese: 中山区
- Traditional Chinese: 中山區
Transcriptions
Standard Mandarin
- Hanyu Pinyin: Zhōngshān Qū

Zhongshan District (Chinese: 中山区; pinyin: Zhōngshān Qū) is one of the seven districts of Dalian, Liaoning province, People's Republic of China, forming part of the urban core. Its area is 40.10 square kilometres (15.48 sq mi) and its permanent population as of 2010 is 339,527.

== Administrative divisions ==
There are 6 subdistricts within the district.

Subdistricts:

- Navy Square Subdistrict (海军广场街道)
- Renmin Road Subdistrict (人民路街道)
- Qingniwaqiao Subdistrict (青泥洼桥街道)
- Kuiying Subdistrict (葵英街道)
- Taoyuan Subdistrict (桃源街道)
- Laohutan Subdistrict (老虎滩街道)

== Education ==
International schools include:

- Japanese School of Dalian

The following secondary schools are within Zhongshan District:

- Dalian No. 2 High School
- Dalian No. 9 Middle School
- Dalian No. 15 High School
- Dalian No. 16 High School
- Dalian No. 24 High School
- Dalian No. 39 Middle School

The following universities are within Zhongshan District:

- PLA Dalian Naval Academy
