= Jingmao =

Jingmao may refer to:

- Chinese subtitle for business and economics (經貿)
- Jingmao Township (景毛乡), Xiangfen County, Linfen, Shanxi, China
- Mu Sheng (1368–1439), courtesy name Jingmao (景茂), a Chinese military general and politician of the Ming dynasty
- Murong Wei (350–385), courtesy name Jingmao (景茂), the last emperor of the Xianbei-led Chinese Former Yan dynasty
- Yao Chang (331–394), courtesy name Jingmao (景茂), the founding emperor of the Later Qin dynasty

== See also ==
- University of Economics and Business (disambiguation)
