= University of Economics =

University of Economics may refer to:

- Cracow University of Economics, Poland
- İzmir University of Economics, Turkey
- Poznań University of Economics, Poland
- Prague University of Economics, Czech Republic
- University of Economics and Innovation, Lublin, Poland
- University of Economics Ho Chi Minh City, Vietnam
- University of Economics in Bratislava, Slovakia
- University of Economics in Katowice, Poland
- University of Economics Varna, Bulgaria
- Vienna University of Economics and Business, Austria
- Wrocław University of Economics, Poland

== See also ==
- University of Economics and Business (disambiguation)
- London School of Economics
