= Baiyu Mountain =

Mountain in the urban area of Lüshunkou District, Dalian, Liaoning, China

Coordinates: 38.81013°N 121.25296°E

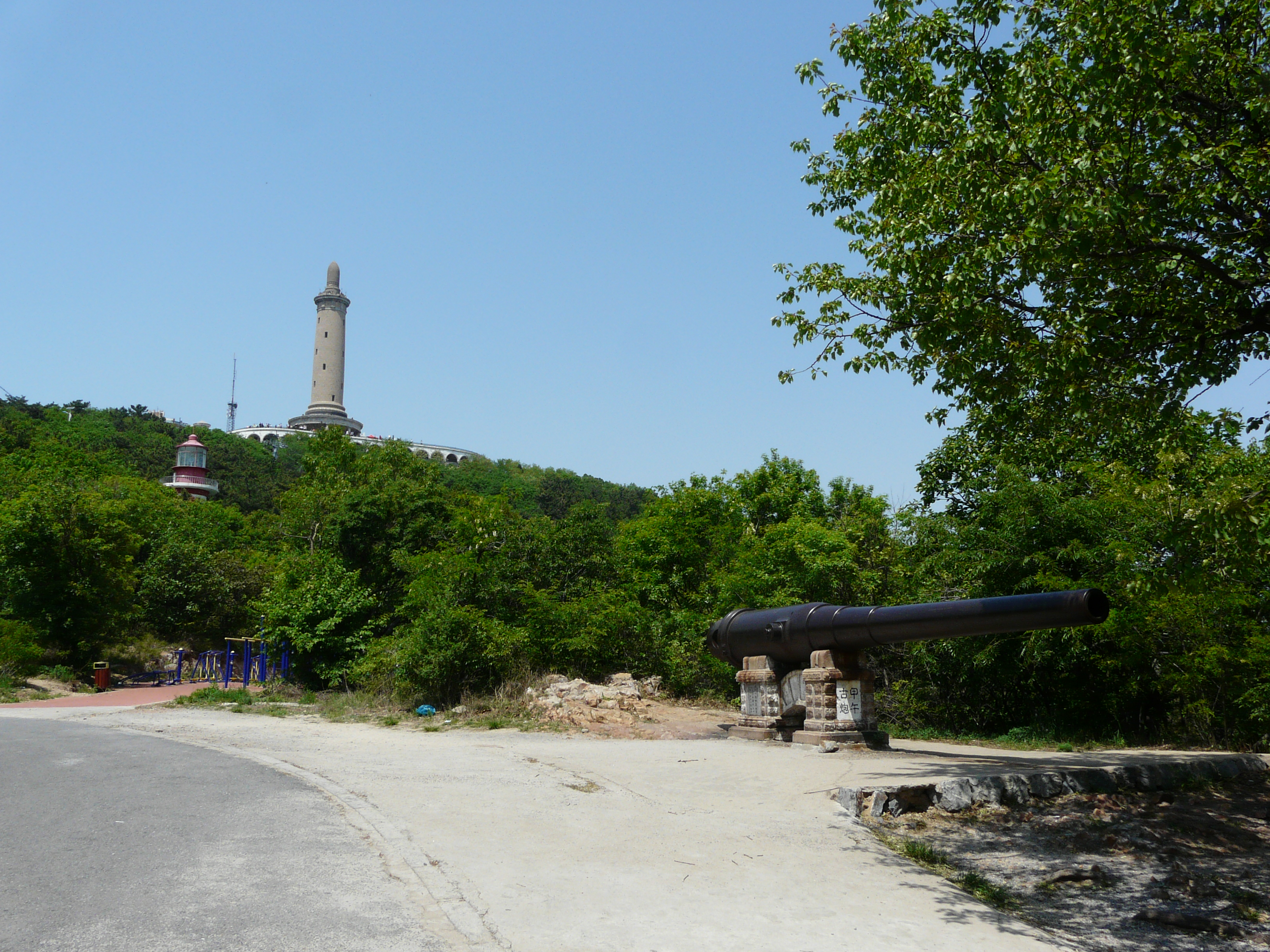
Baiyu Mountain with the Baiyu Mountain Tower

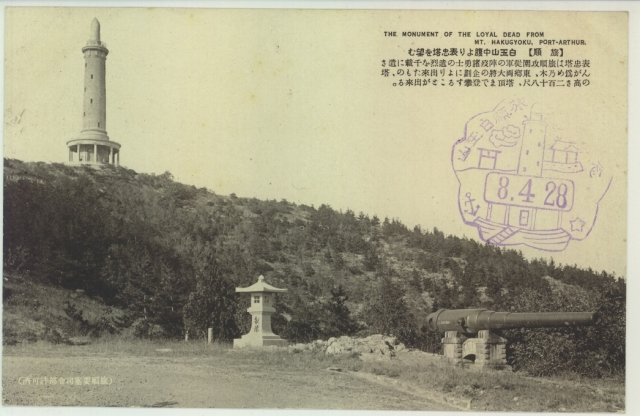
Baiyu Mountain with the Baiyu Mountain Tower (1928)

Baiyu Mountain (Chinese: 白玉山) is a mountain in the urban area of Lüshunkou District, Dalian, Liaoning, China. It is located near the center of the urban area, with an altitude of 130 meters.

== Name ==
Baiyu Mountain was formerly known as Xiguan Mountain (西官山). During the Self-Strengthening Movement in the late Qing Dynasty was built the Beiyang Fleet's Lüshun Naval Base in the bay at the foot of this mountain. In 1880, Li Hongzhang (李鴻章) inspected Lüshun Port and climbed to the top of the mountain with Yixuan, Prince Chun, the father of Emperor Guangxu. When they learned that the opposite mountain was called Gold Mountain, they said that, where there is gold, there must be white jade, so it was renamed Baiyu Mountain. There is another saying that the mountain got its name from the white terrain like jade in the early years. In 1995, Baiyu Mountain was named as Dalian City's Patriotic Education Base.

== Baiyu Mountain Tower ==
The Baiyu Mountain Tower is located on the top of Baiyu Mountain. It was built in 1909 by the Japanese after the Russo-Japanese War to commemorate the Japanese officers and soldiers who had died in Lüshun. It was a Tomb of the Unknown Soldier monument called "Biaozhong Tower" (表忠塔) at that time. More than 3,000 Chinese laborers were forcibly recruited to build this tower, which took two and a half years to complete.

== Gallery ==
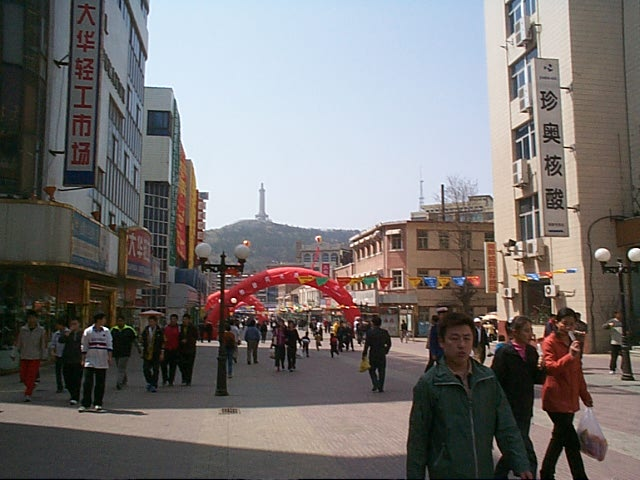
Baiyu Mountain from Lüshun's New Town

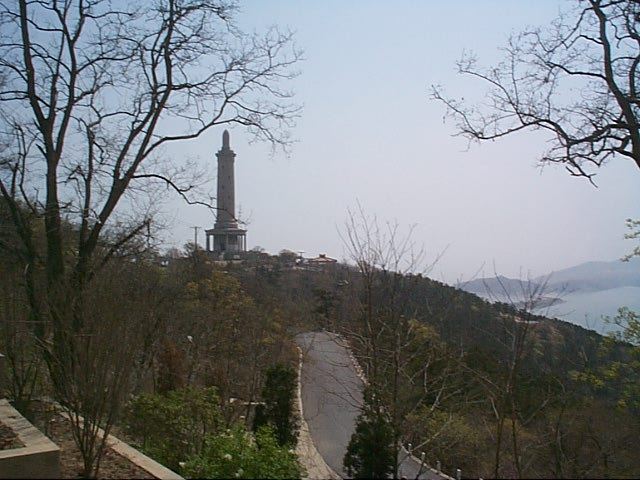
Road up to Baiyu Mountain

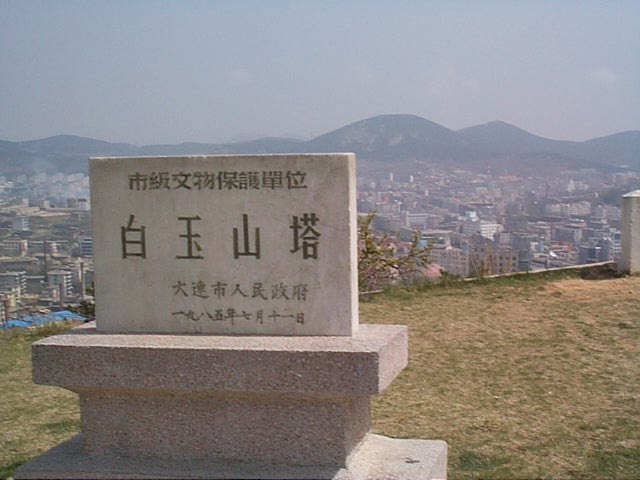
The nameplate of Baiyu Mountain Tower

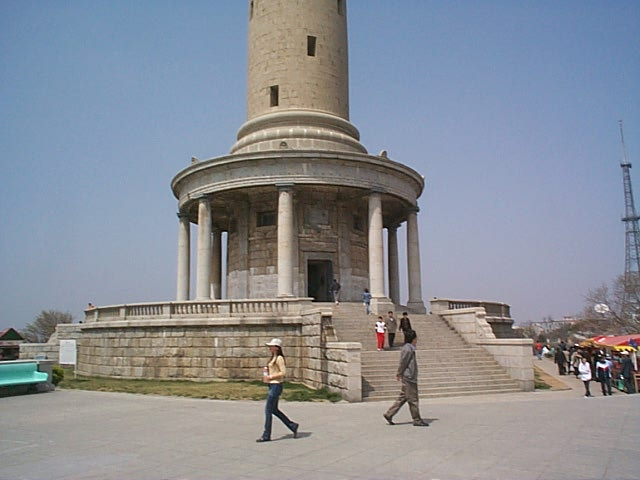
Baiyu Mountain Tower

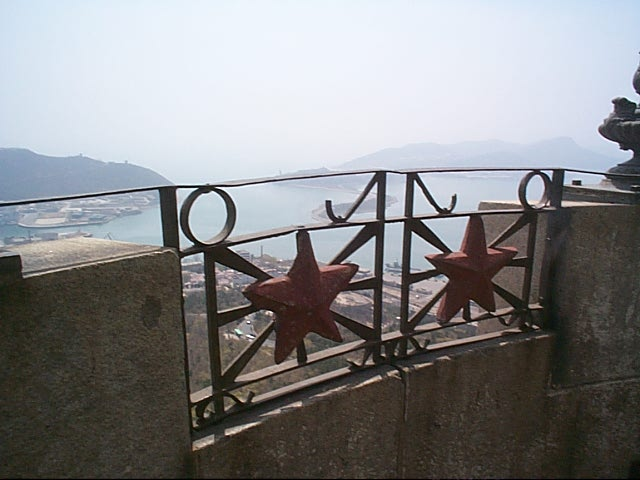
The view from Baiyu Mountain Tower: the Naval Port on left & Tiger's Tail Peninsula on right

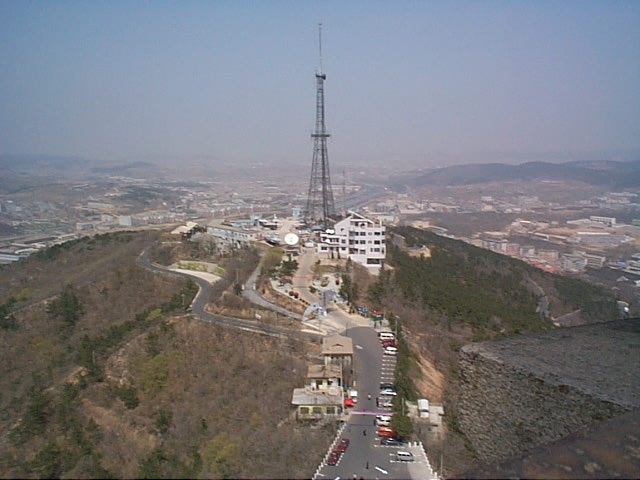
Looking over another peak of Baiyu Mountain

== See also ==
- List of Major National Historical and Cultural Sites in Liaoning
- 203 Hill and the Tomb of the Unknown Soldier spire monument on its summit
