= List of Jingū =

Jingū (神宮) is a name for a Shinto shrine connected to the Imperial House of Japan.

== List of Jingū ==
The following list encompasses only some, but not all of the Heian period Nijūnisha shrines (Twenty-Two Shrines); and the modern shrines which were established after the Meiji Restoration are not omitted. In the list below, these shrines are marked with "^{‡}".

- Ise Jingu
- Akama Jingu
- Atsuta Jingu
- Heian Jingu^{‡}
- Hikosan Jingu
- Hinokuma Jingu
- Hokkaidō Jingu
- Isonokami Jingu
- Izanagi Jingu^{‡}
- Kagoshima Jingu
- Kashihara Jingu
- Kashima Jingu
- Katori Jingu
- Kehi Jingu
- Kirishima Jingu
- Meiji Jingu^{‡}
- Minase Jingu
- Miyazaki Jingu
- Omi Jingu
- Shiramine Jingū
- Udo Jingu
- Usa Jingu
- Yoshino Jingu

Ise Grand Shrine is also known by the formal name Jingū with no further designation.

== Defunct shrines ==
- Chōsen Jingū
- Kantō Jingū (extinct)
- Fuyo Jingu
- Taiwan Jingu

== See also ==
- List of Shinto shrines
- List of Tōshō-gū
- Nijūnisha (二十二社, twenty-two shrines)
