= Kantō Shrine =

Shinto shrine in Lüshunkou District, Kwantung Leased Territory

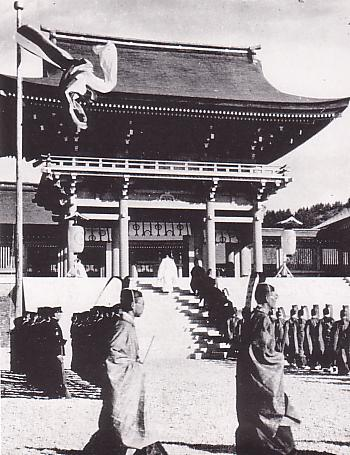
- The Kanto shrine

Religion
- Affiliation: Shinto
- Deity: Emperor Meiji; Amaterasu

Location
- Municipality: Lüshunkou, Dalian
- Country: Kwantung Leased Territory
- Interactive map of Kantō Shrine
- Coordinates: 38°48′55.08050″N 121°13′39.83995″E

Kantō Shrine (関東神宮, Kantō jingu) was a Shinto shrine in Lüshunkou District, Kwantung Leased Territory (today Lüshunkou, Dalian, Liaoning, China). It was established on June 1, 1938, and closed in 1945 at the end of the Japanese occupation of China. It was formerly an imperial shrine of the first rank (官幣社, kanpeisha) in the Modern system of ranked Shinto Shrines. The kami enshrined here were Emperor Meiji and Amaterasu.

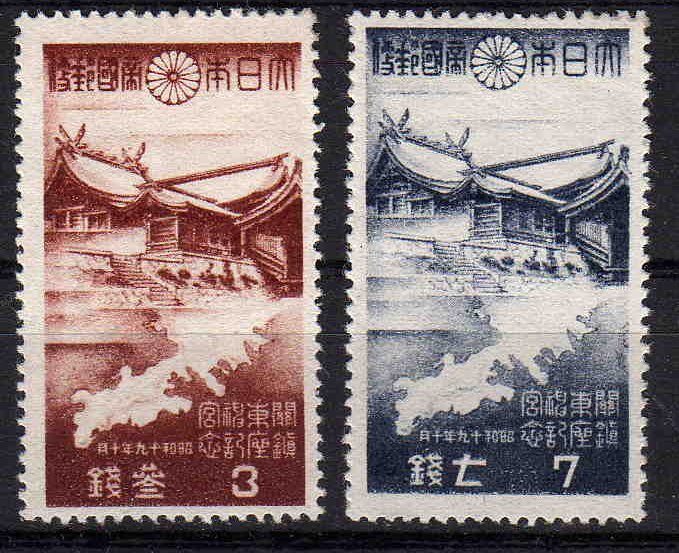
Commemorative stamp for its creation in 1944

== See also ==
- List of Jingū
