= Lüshunkou =

Lüshunkou 旅顺口区
- District
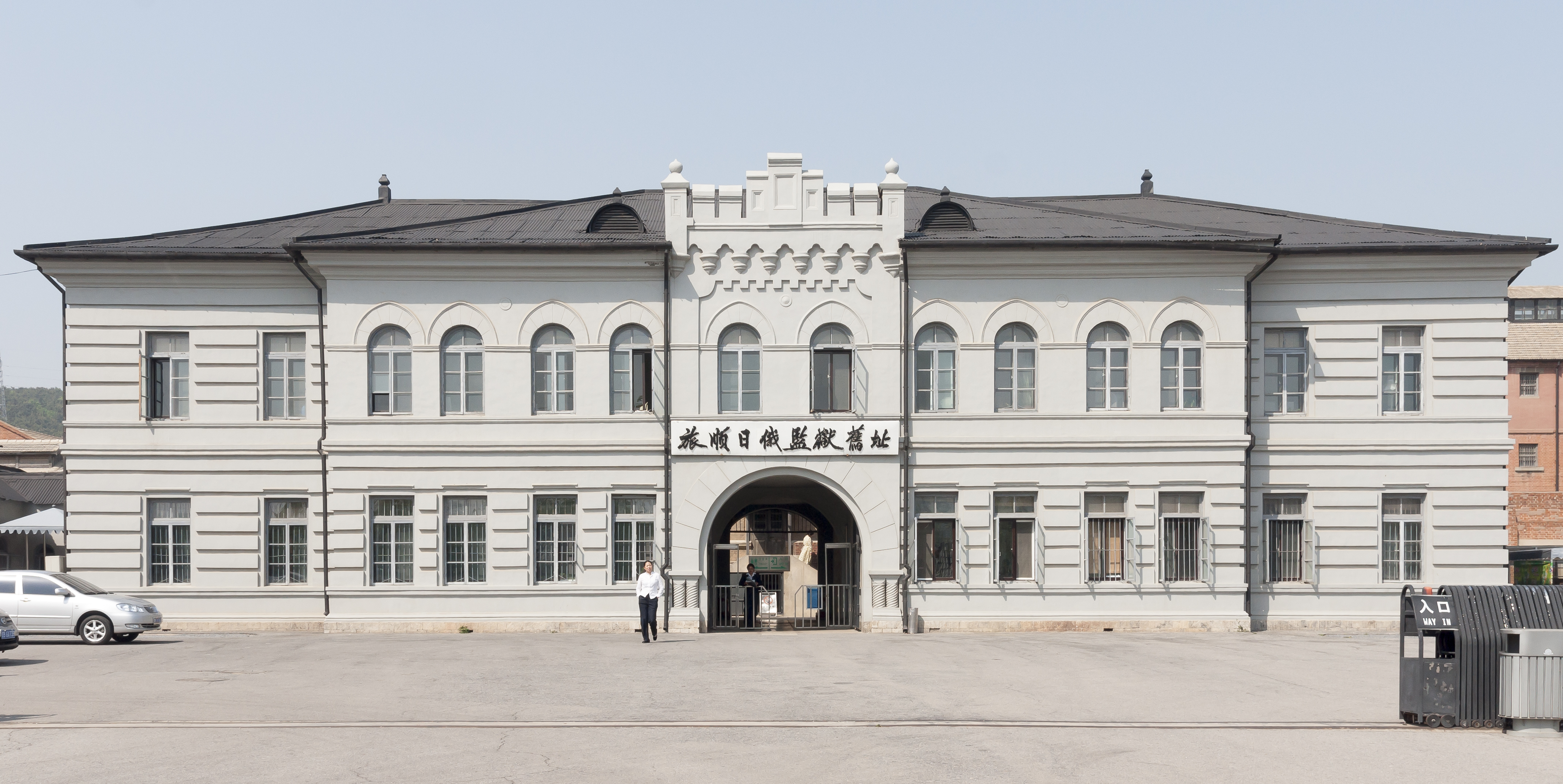
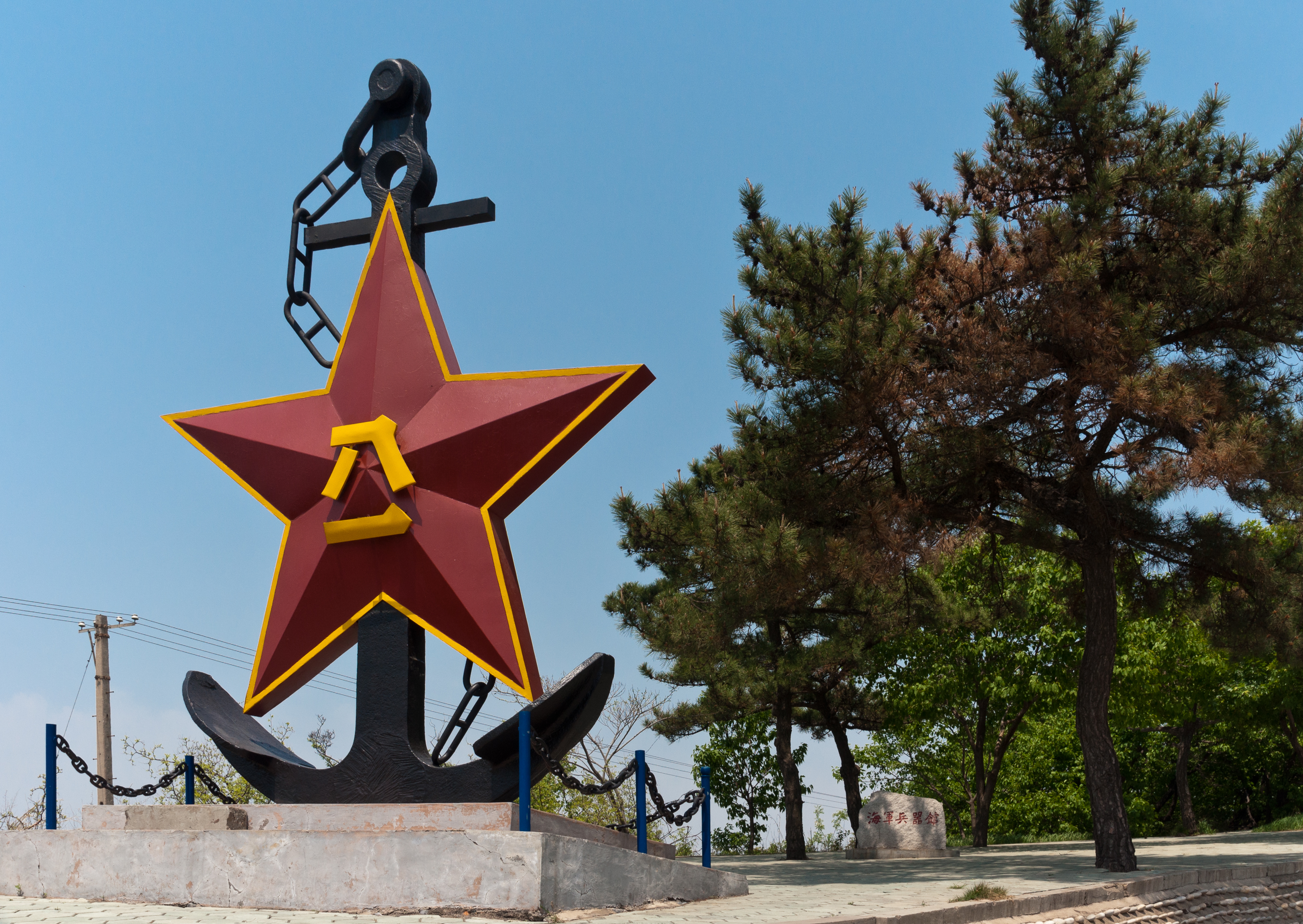
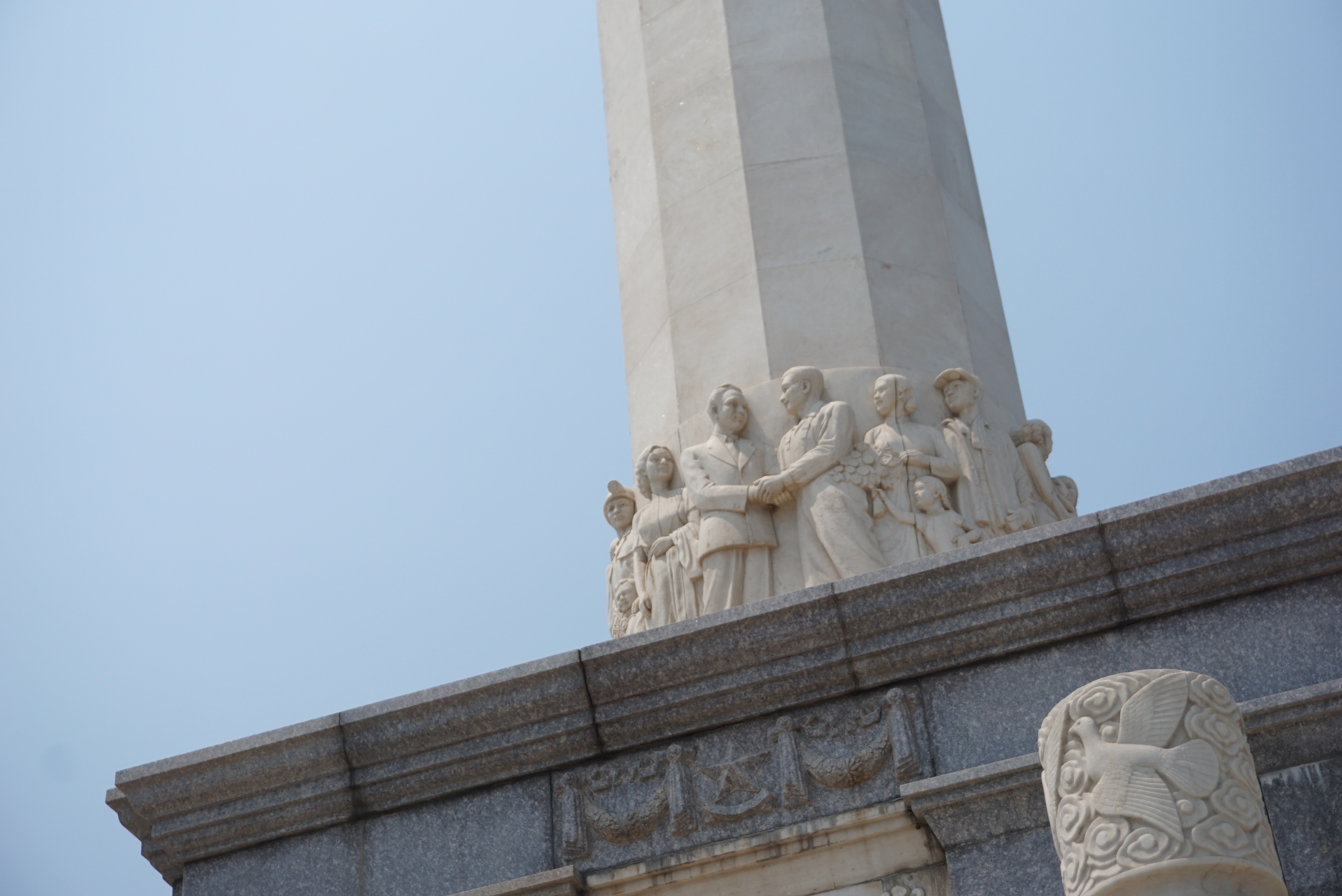
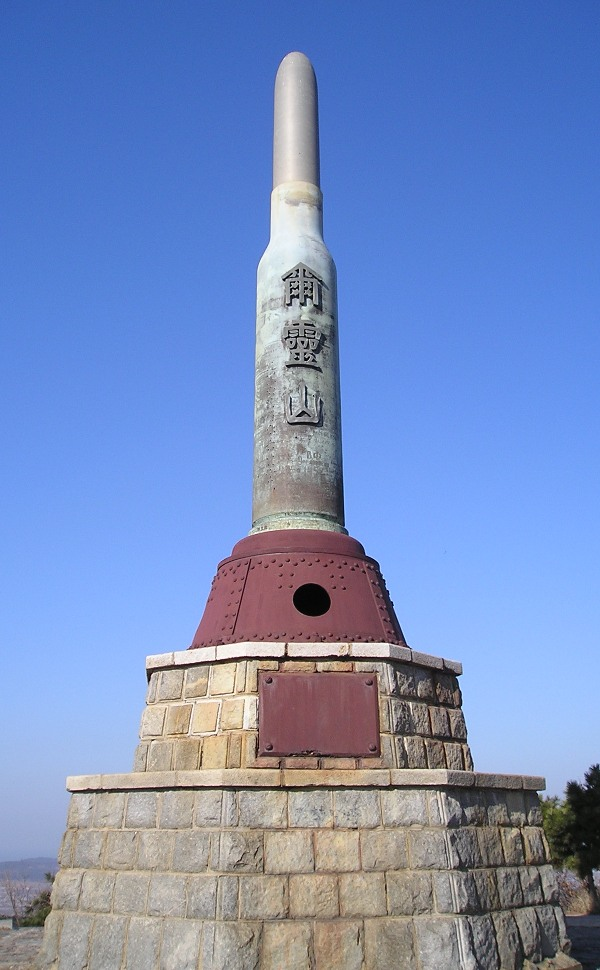
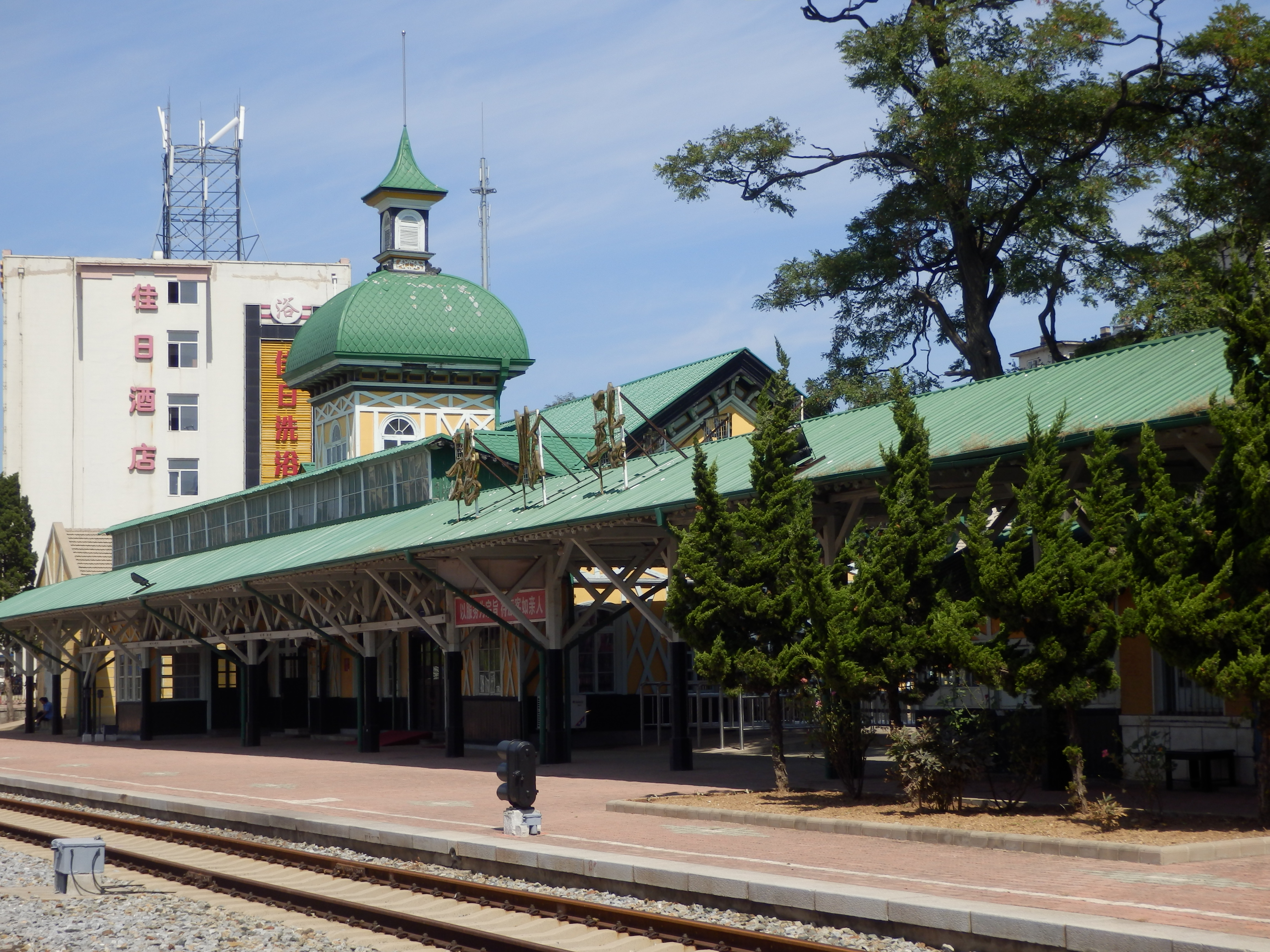
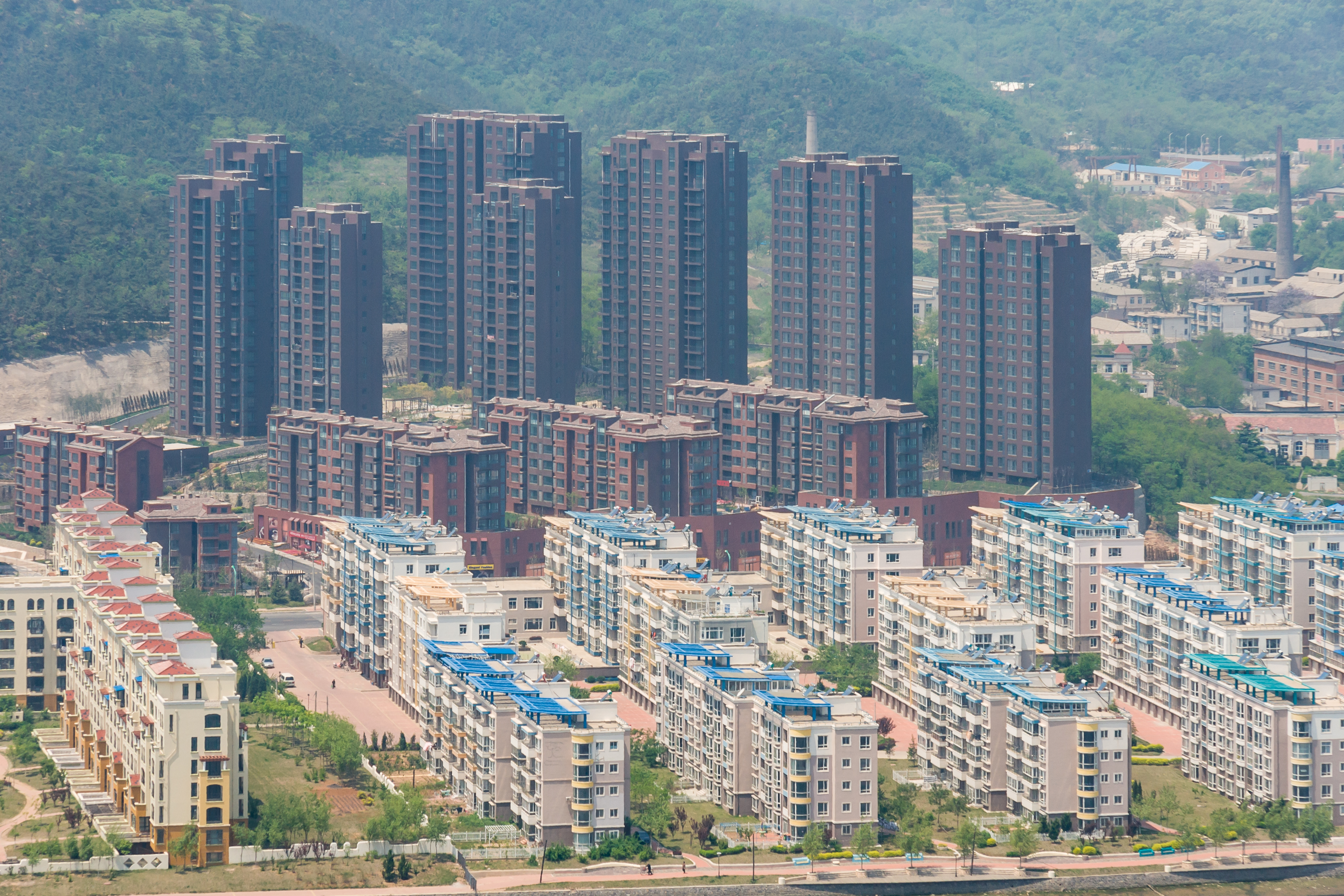
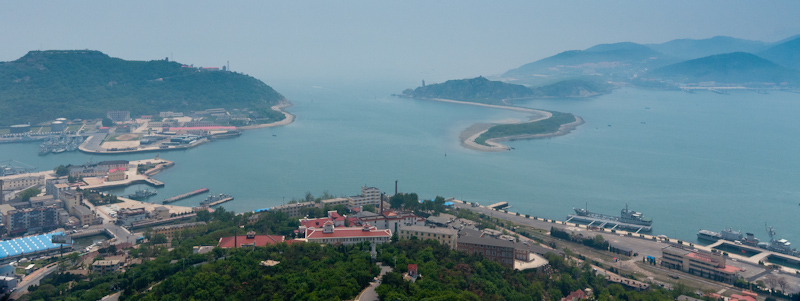
- Russo-Japanese Prison Museum PLAN base Memorial Tower of Sino-Soviet Friendship Hill 203 Lüshun railway station A residential area of Lüshun Port of Lüshun

- Location in Liaoning Lüshunkou (China)
- Coordinates: 38°51′03″N 121°15′25″E
- Country: People's Republic of China
- Province: Liaoning
- Sub-provincial city: Dalian

Area
  - Total: 512.15 km^{2} (197.74 sq mi)

Population (2020)
  - Total: 398,579
  - Density: 778.25/km^{2} (2,015.6/sq mi)
- Time zone: UTC+8 (China Standard)
- Division code: 210212
- Website: www.dllsk.gov.cn

Lüshunkou District (also Lyushunkou District; 旅顺口区), commonly known as Lüshun (旅顺), is a district of Dalian, Liaoning Province, China. The district has an area of 512.15 km^{2} (197.74 sq mi) and a permanent population of 398,579 as of 2020.

Lüshunkou is located at the extreme southern tip of the Liaodong Peninsula. It has a natural harbor, the possession and control of which became a casus belli of the Russo-Japanese War (1904–05). Imperial Japanese and then Tsarist Russian administration was established in 1895 and continued until 1905 when control was ceded to Japan. During that period, it was world-famous and was more significant than the other port on the peninsula, Dalian proper.

Lüshunkou was formerly known as both Port Arthur (Russian: Порт-Артур, romanized: Port-Artur) and Ryojun (Japanese: 旅順). After World War II, it was returned to China as Lüshun City. In 1960, Lüshun was redesignated as a district of Dalian (known as Lüda until 1981).

== Toponym ==
Lüshunkou, meaning "port of smooth journeys", was named in 1371 to commemorate a successful Ming expedition into Liaodong. A naval force set sail from Penglai, Shandong and landed at Lüshunkou to attack the remaining Yuan forces on the Liaodong Peninsula.

In English-language diplomatic, news, and historical writings, it was known as Port Arthur after a British Royal Navy Lieutenant named William Arthur who surveyed the harbour in the gunboat HMS Algerine in 1860.

During the period when the Japanese Empire controlled and administered the Liaodong (= Liaotung) Peninsula it was called Ryojun (旅順), the Japanese pronunciation of the Chinese characters in the city's name. After the Japanese defeat in World War II, the city was under the administration of the Soviet Union, which rented the port from China, until 1950. Although the Soviets presented the port to the new People's Republic of China in 1950, Soviet Armed Forces troops remained in the city until 1955.

== Geography ==
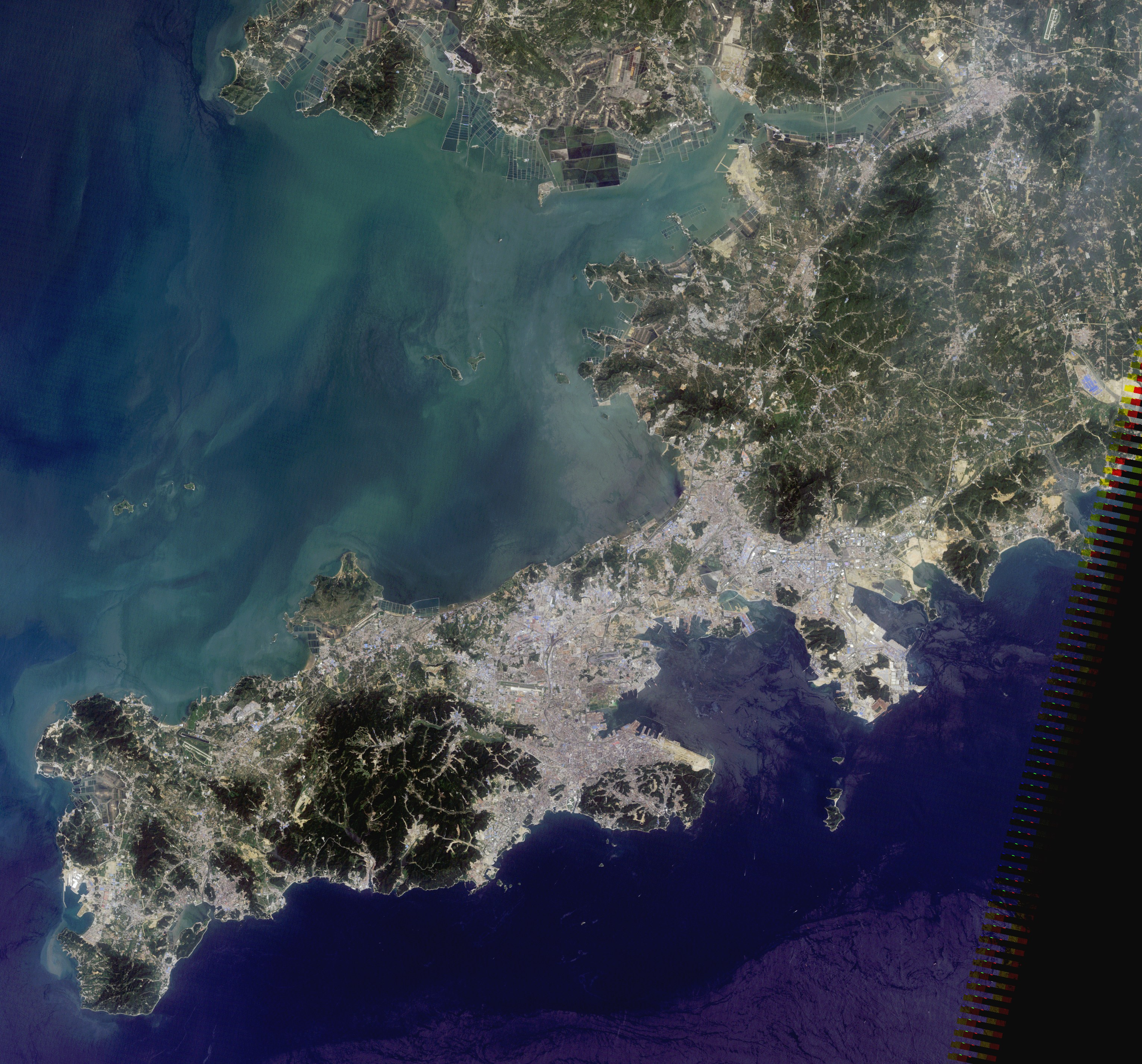
Dalian and vicinities, Landsat 5 satellite image, 2010-08-03

Central Dalian is some 40 km (25 mi) farther up the coast, sprawling around the narrowest neck of the Liaodong Peninsula (simplified Chinese: 辽东半岛; traditional Chinese: 遼東半島; pinyin: Liáodōng Bàndǎo), whereas Lüshun occupies its southern tip. Lüshun City surrounds the lake-like structure near the peninsular tip. The lake-like feature is the inner natural harbour of the port, a well-sheltered and fortifiable harbour to 19th century eyes.

The Liaodong Peninsula has the Yellow Sea to its southeast with Korea beyond, the Korea Bay to its due east, and the Bohai Sea (or Gulf) to its west. Beijing is due west-northwest across the Bo Hai Gulf from the port city.

== History ==
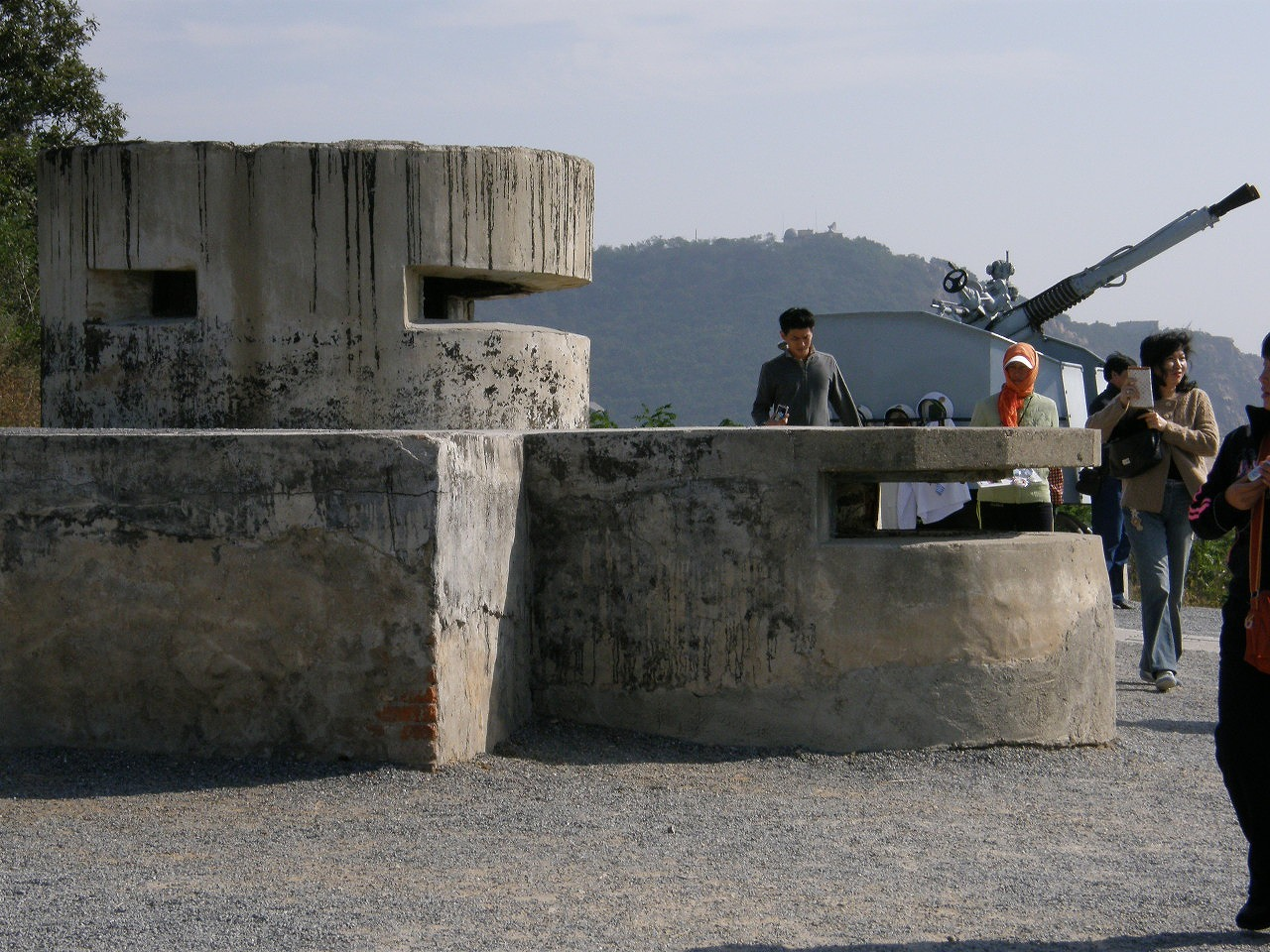
Artillery battery at a fortress in Lüshunkou

In the late 1880s, the German company Krupp was contracted by the Qing dynasty to build a series of fortifications around Port Arthur. Reportedly, this was after local contractors had "made an extensive bungle of the job".

Port Arthur first came into international prominence during the First Sino-Japanese War (1894–1895). Following Japan's victory over the Imperial Chinese Army troops at the Battle of Pyongyang in Korea in September 1894, the Japanese First and Second Armies converged on the Liaodong Peninsula by land and sea. Imperial Japanese Armed Forces war planners, ambitious for control of the Liaodong Peninsula and Port Arthur and also cognizant of that port's strategic position controlling the northern Yellow Sea routes and the passage to Tianjin, were determined to seize it.

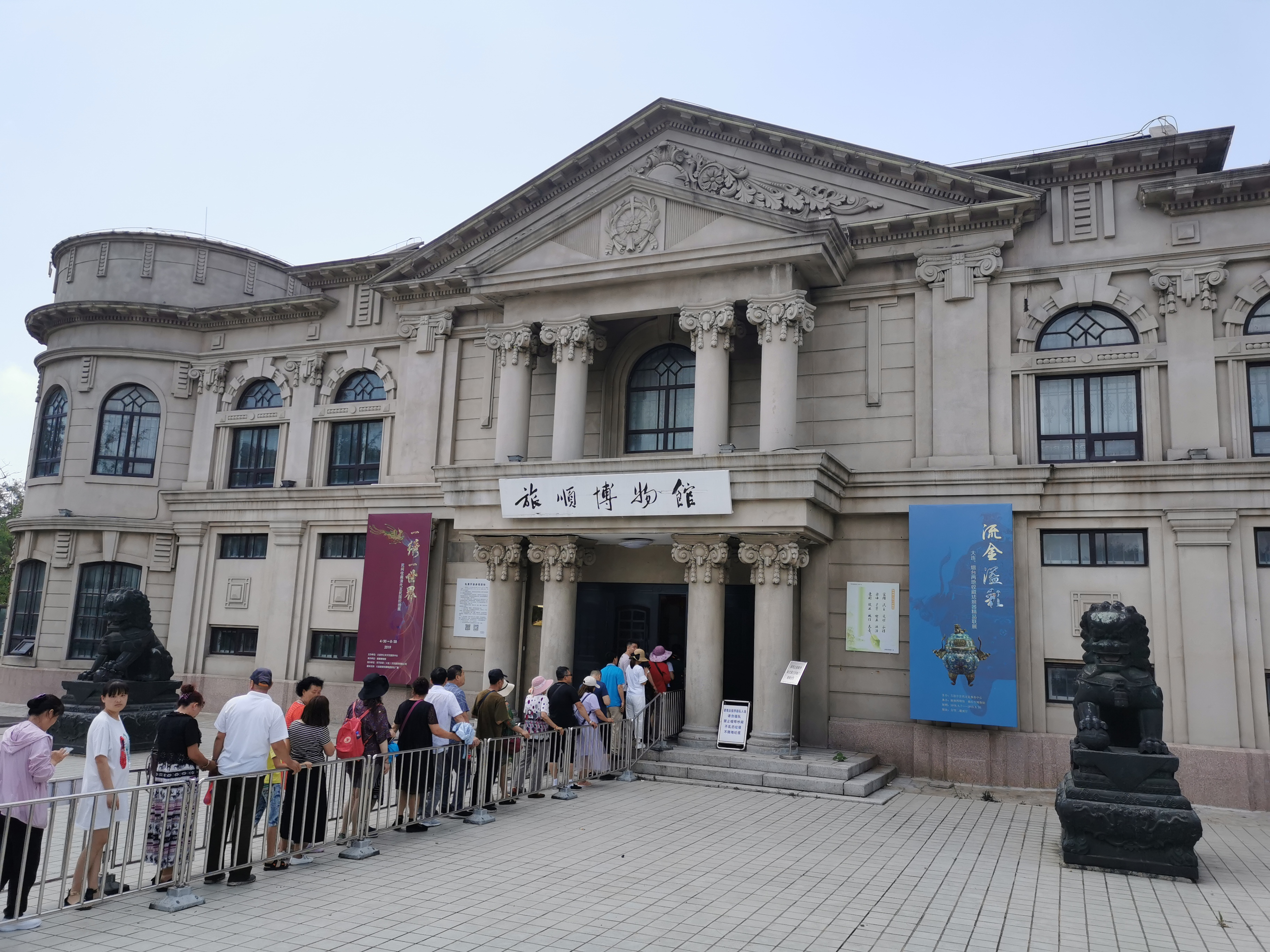
Lüshun Museum

On 20–21 November 1894, 15,000 Japanese troops defeated 13,000 Qing soldiers and conquered Lüshunkou. The Port Arthur massacre resulted in the deaths of somewhere between 2,600 civilians and 20,000 people including Chinese soldiers.

Japan went on to occupy Port Arthur and to seize control of the whole Liaodong Peninsula. As part of the terms of the 1895 Treaty of Shimonoseki concluding the war, Japan was granted the Liaodong Peninsula but had to cede the territory when threatened jointly with war by France, Germany and Russia in what is called the Triple Intervention of 1895. This was seen as a great humiliation in Japan.

=== Russian base in Port Arthur ===
The Russian Empire in 1898 coerced a lease from China of the Liaodong Peninsula and created the territory of Russian Dalian. It gained railroad right-of-way to join the Liaodong Peninsula to the Chinese Eastern Railway with a line running from Port Arthur to the Chinese city of Harbin, and systematically began to fortify the town and harbour at Port Arthur. Tsar Nicholas II believed this acquisition of a Pacific port would enhance Russian security, and extend its economic influence. He was also falsely informed that the British Empire was considering seizing the port. Nicholas founded Dalny (later Dairen, now Dalian) near Port Arthur and also on the Chinese Eastern Railway. In 1902, the Russian viceroy de-emphasized Dalny, building a palace and cultural edifices at Port Arthur instead. All of these developments contributed to Japanese resentment towards Russia over competing imperial aims in Manchuria.

=== Russo-Japanese War (1904–1905) ===
Ten years later, Port Arthur again played a central role in war in China. After the Boxer Rebellion (1900–01) had been extinguished by an international Eight-Nation Alliance of troops, the Imperial Russian Army refused to withdraw its reinforcements from Manchuria and instead began to fortify and garrison the entire route along the Southern Manchurian Railway. With this development, Japan proposed the two powers meet and discuss their respective roles in eastern Manchuria, as the area was considered being in their respective spheres of influence. Talks were conducted between 1902 and 1904. While numerous proposals and agreement papers were generated between the two powers, Russia continued the de facto annexation of territory through fortification and garrison, if not de jure; while employing stalling tactics in its negotiations. In the end, after more than two years of intensive bilateral negotiations failed to clarify each country's rights, prerogatives, and interests in Manchuria, Japan attacked Port Arthur and the Russian fleet without declaring war in February 1904.

==== The Battle of Port Arthur ====
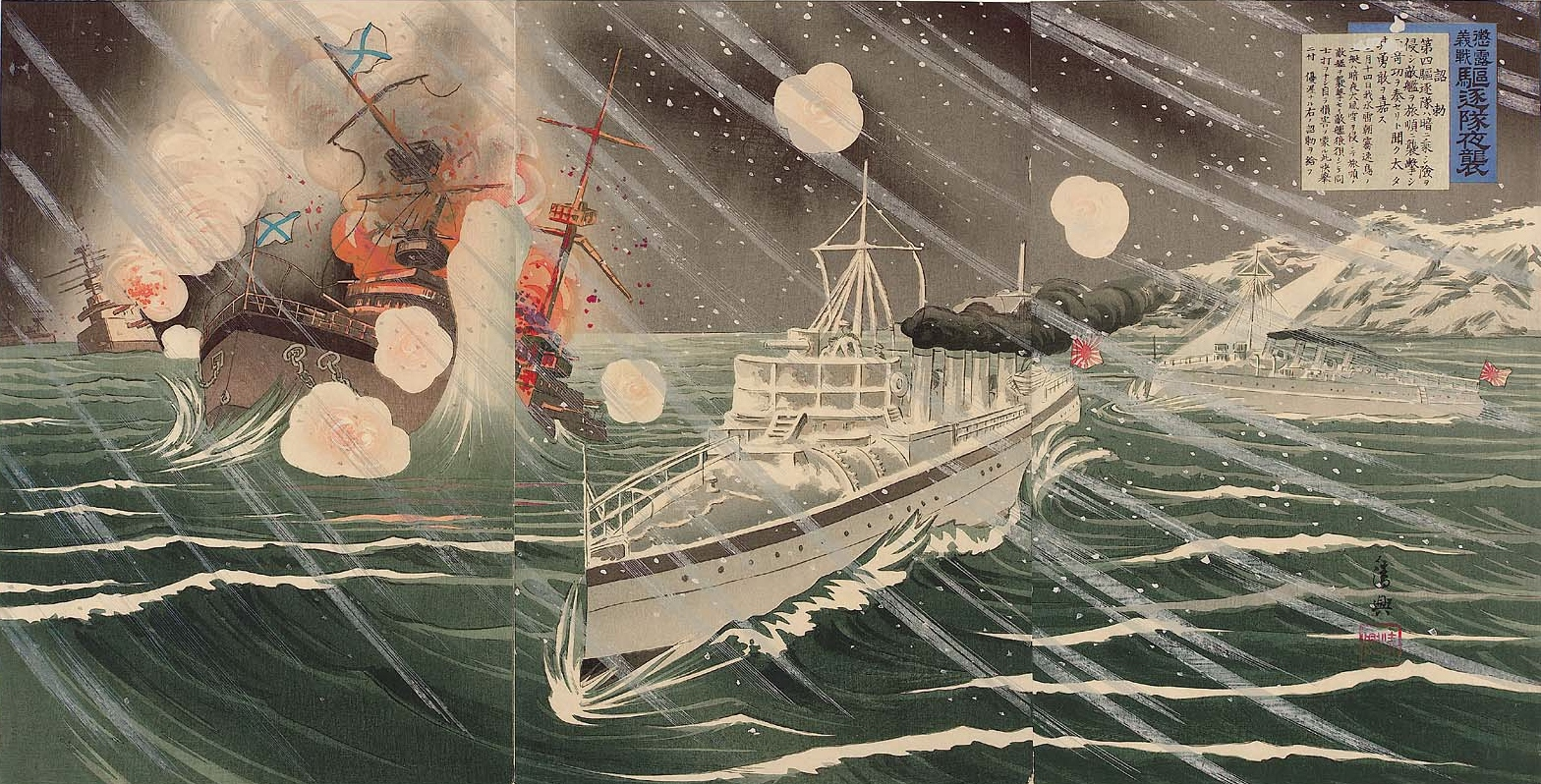
A Japanese propaganda block print of the night attack on Port Arthur by the Japanese Navy

The Battle of Port Arthur, the opening battle of the Russo-Japanese War, was fought in the heavily fortified harbour of the town of Port Arthur/Lüshun on 9 February 1904 when the Japanese attacked at night with torpedoes, followed by a brief daylight skirmish by major surface combatants.

By the end of July 1904, the Japanese army had pushed down the Liaodong peninsula and was at the outer defences of Port Arthur. The fact that Japanese forces had closed to within artillery range of the harbour in early August 1904 led directly to the naval Battle of the Yellow Sea which solidified Japan's command of the sea, where her fleets continued to blockade the harbour. Virtually all the battles of the war until July 1904 were strategic battles for territorial gain or position leading to the investment and siege of the port city.

The port eventually fell 2 January 1905 after a long train of battles on land and sea during which the Japanese occupied the whole of the Korean Peninsula, split the Russian Army, devastated the Imperial Russian Navy, and cut off the source of supplies on the railway from Harbin, culminating in the bloody battle known as the Siege of Port Arthur (June–January; some sources place the siege start in late July, a technical difference due to definitions).

=== Japanese Ryojun ===
After Japan's defeat of Russia, it took over Kwantung Leased Territory and renamed Port Arthur Ryojun. The Japanese-controlled Ryojun City had 40 districts. They built the war monuments on 203 Hill and Baiyu Mountain. The Port Arthur–Harbin line became part of the South Manchurian Railway. After Japan created the puppet state of Manchukuo in 1932, Japan regarded its lease as being held from Manchukuo rather than from China.

=== Post-war administration ===
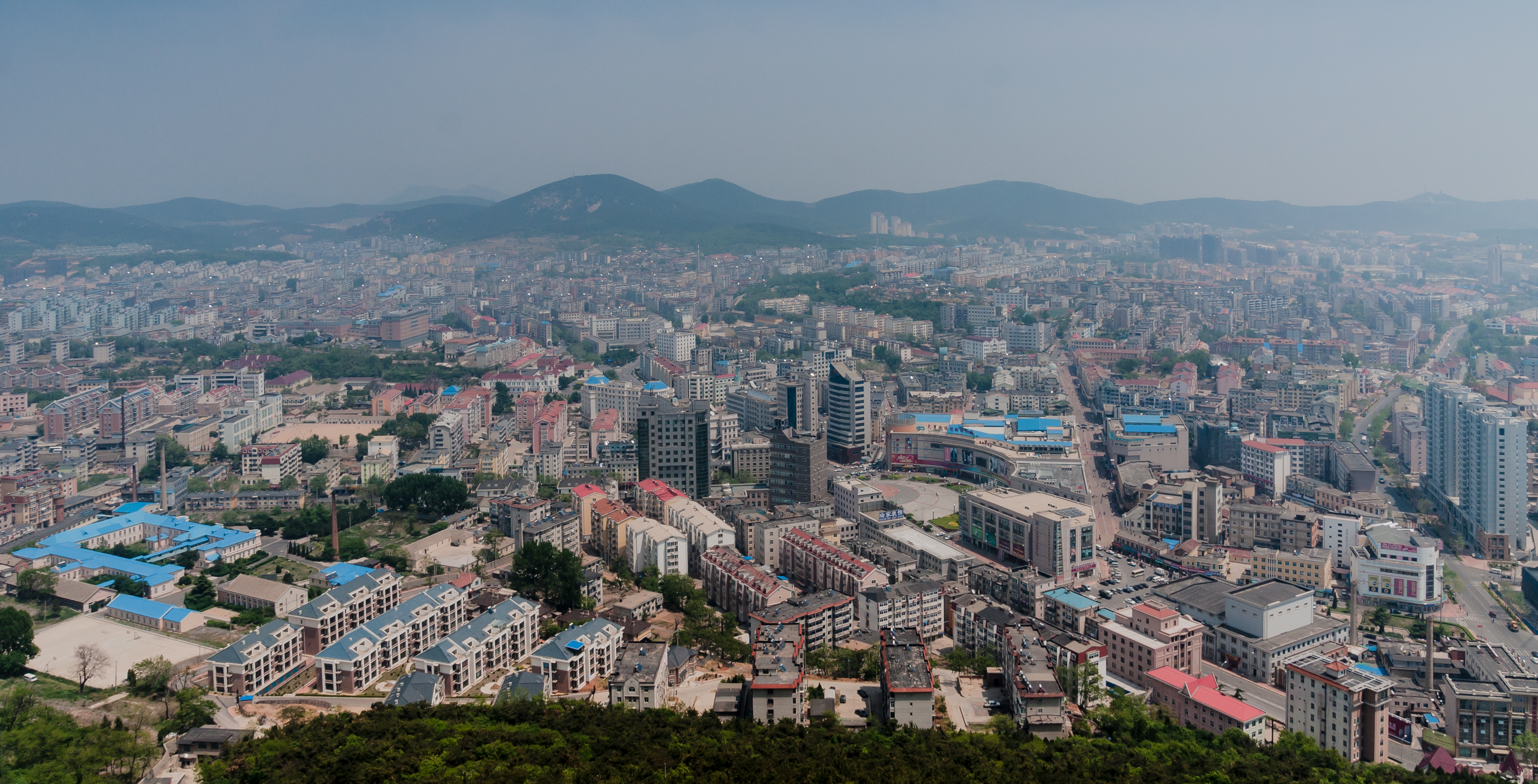
View of Lüshunkou

The Chinese Lüshun City was established on 25 November 1945 to replace Ryojun. The city was a subdivision of a larger Lüda City and contained 40 villages in 3 districts: Dazhong (大众区; 大眾區), Wenhua (文化), and Guangming (光明). In January 1946, Wenhua was merged into Dazhong, and the 40 villages were reduced to 23 communes (坊). In January 1948, the remaining two districts were merged into one: Shinei (市内区; 市內區), with 12 communes.

Under the Sino-Soviet Treaty of Friendship and Alliance signed by Joseph Stalin and Chiang Kai-shek, the Republic of China agreed to allow the Soviet Navy to maintain a base there in exchange for Soviet diplomatic recognition of the Nationalist government. However, the USSR later used the port to assist the Chinese Communist Party's People's Liberation Army during the Chinese Civil War, leading to the Kuomintang's overthrow.

On 7 January 1960, Lüshun City was renamed Lüshunkou District, still under Lüda. In 1981, Lüda was renamed Dalian, with Lüshunkou remaining a constituent district. In 1985, 7 of Lüshunkou's 9 townships were upgraded to towns.

Lüshunkou District administers 9 subdistricts; all of the former towns were either abolished, merged or converted into subdistricts themselves.

- Dengfeng Subdistrict (登峰街道)
- Desheng Subdistrict (得胜街道)
- Shuishiying Subdistrict (水师营街道)
- Longwangtang Subdistrict (龙王塘街道)
- Tieshan Subdistrict (铁山街道)
- Shuangdaowan Subdistrict (双岛湾街道)
- Sanjianpu Subdistrict (三涧堡街道)
- Changcheng Subdistrict (长城街道)
- Longtou Subdistrict (龙头街道)

The city's southern half along Lüshun South Road, central Lüshun and the Naval Port zone continue to be off-limits to foreigners although Lüshunkou District is thoroughly modernized. The World Peace Park opened on the western coast of Lüshun, becoming a sightseeing spot.

The universities in downtown Dalian are being relocated to Lüshunkou. Dalian Jiaotong University (formerly Dalian Railroad University) moved its software school to the area near the new port, and the Dalian University of Foreign Languages and Dalian Medical University relocated their main campuses to the eastern slope of Baiying Mountain, on Lüshun South Road. Dalian Fisheries University is in the process of moving its English and Japanese language schools to Daheishi, on Lüshun North Road. From late 2006, Sinorail has operated the Bohai Train Ferry between Lüshun, Dalian, and Yantai, Shandong.

Historic and modern names, translated into English, of landmark facilities in Lüshun
Under Russian rule	Under Japanese rule	Under Chinese rule
The Old Town
Unknown	Lüshun City Hall	Commercial Bldg. on right of New Mart Supermarket
Unknown	Public Welfare Office	Naval Hotel
—	Lüshun Branch, Bank of Chōsen	Lüshun Branch, Commercial Bank of China
—	Lüshun No. 1 Primary School	A Naval Facility (on left of Zhangjian Rd. South 3rd Alley)
Red Cross Hospital	Lüshun Hospital & Medical School	A Naval Facility (Lüshunkou Hospital on north side)
—	Kwantung High Court	Old Kwantung High Court (inside Hospital premises)
Lüshun Jail (Gray Walled Bldgs.)	Lüshun Jail (Extended with Red Walled Bldgs.)	Russo-Japanese Jail (Anti-Imperialist Propaganda Facility)
—	Lüshun Danish Lutheran Church	Lüshunkou Christian Church
—	Hyochu (Showing Loyalty) Tower	White Jade Tower
—	Asahi (Morning Sun) Plaza	Friendship Park
The New Town
Unknown	Japan Bridge (over the Long He)	Liberation Bridge
Russian Marines Hqs.	Lüshun Institute of Technology	Navy Hospital No. 406
Unknown	Lüshun High School	A Naval Facility (Lüshun command)
A German Merchant's Store	Lüshun (No. 1) Middle School	A Naval facility (No. 58 Stalin Rd.)
Meeting Place of Sniper Unit's Non-commissioned Officers	Lüshun No. 2 Primary School	Dalian City No. 56 Middle School
Ji Fengtai's Shop	The Lüshun Yamato Hotel	Shop & Hostel
Unknown	Lüshun No. 2 Middle School	Not Used
Photoshop/Town Hall/Restaurant	Lüshun Girls' High School	Navy Related Families' Living Quarters
Unknown	Kodama Ground	Ground for Navy
Unknown	Korakuen Park	Lüshun Museum Park

== Climate ==
Climate data for Lüshunkou District, elevation 67 m (220 ft), (1991–2020 normals, extremes 1991–present)
Month	Jan	Feb	Mar	Apr	May	Jun	Jul	Aug	Sep	Oct	Nov	Dec	Year
Record high °C (°F)	11.2 (52.2)	15.1 (59.2)	22.3 (72.1)	26.7 (80.1)	33.6 (92.5)	34.7 (94.5)	37.5 (99.5)	37.5 (99.5)	32.0 (89.6)	27.0 (80.6)	20.5 (68.9)	14.3 (57.7)	37.5 (99.5)
Mean daily maximum °C (°F)	0.6 (33.1)	2.7 (36.9)	7.9 (46.2)	14.6 (58.3)	20.4 (68.7)	24.2 (75.6)	27.0 (80.6)	27.7 (81.9)	24.5 (76.1)	18.2 (64.8)	10.3 (50.5)	3.5 (38.3)	15.1 (59.2)
Daily mean °C (°F)	−3.0 (26.6)	−1.0 (30.2)	3.8 (38.8)	10.1 (50.2)	15.9 (60.6)	20.2 (68.4)	23.6 (74.5)	24.3 (75.7)	20.8 (69.4)	14.4 (57.9)	6.7 (44.1)	0.0 (32.0)	11.3 (52.4)
Mean daily minimum °C (°F)	−6.3 (20.7)	−4.3 (24.3)	0.4 (32.7)	6.4 (43.5)	12.0 (53.6)	17.0 (62.6)	21.1 (70.0)	21.6 (70.9)	17.3 (63.1)	10.7 (51.3)	3.1 (37.6)	−3.5 (25.7)	8.0 (46.3)
Record low °C (°F)	−18.0 (−0.4)	−15.4 (4.3)	−8.5 (16.7)	−1.3 (29.7)	5.0 (41.0)	8.6 (47.5)	15.8 (60.4)	14.3 (57.7)	7.9 (46.2)	−0.7 (30.7)	−9.0 (15.8)	−13.0 (8.6)	−18.0 (−0.4)
Average precipitation mm (inches)	4.0 (0.16)	6.4 (0.25)	11.5 (0.45)	32.5 (1.28)	55.7 (2.19)	71.2 (2.80)	129.0 (5.08)	160.4 (6.31)	46.1 (1.81)	34.3 (1.35)	26.1 (1.03)	8.5 (0.33)	585.7 (23.04)
Average precipitation days (≥ 0.1 mm)	3.1	2.2	3.0	5.5	6.5	7.8	9.0	8.5	5.2	5.3	5.2	4.3	65.6
Average snowy days	6.0	3.7	1.7	0.2	0	0	0	0	0	0.2	3.2	7.4	22.4
Average relative humidity (%)	60	61	59	60	64	77	85	84	73	65	62	60	68
Mean monthly sunshine hours	178.6	182.7	233.2	242.1	264.7	231.7	192.7	211.7	225.4	210.8	160.7	154.8	2,489.1
Percentage possible sunshine	59	60	63	61	60	52	43	51	61	62	54	53	57
Source: China Meteorological Administrationall-time extreme (set in July and August)

== Education ==
- Liaoning University of International Business and Economics

== See also ==
- Lüshun Port
- Kantō Shrine
- Rail transport in China
- Shuishiying
- Twenty-One Demands
