= University of Economics and Business =

University of Economics and Business or University of International Business and Economics may refer to:

== University of International Business and Economics ==
- University of International Business and Economics in Beijing, China
- Liaoning University of International Business and Economics
- Shanghai University of International Business and Economics

== University of Economics and Business ==
- Athens University of Economics and Business
- Capital University of Economics and Business, Beijing, China
- Hebei University of Economics and Business
- Poznań University of Economics and Business
- Vienna University of Economics and Business

== See also ==
- Nova School of Business and Economics
- School of Economics and Business, Ljubljana
- School of Economics and Business Sarajevo
- John Chambers College of Business and Economics
