= Hill 203 =

High ground in China

Coordinates: 38°49′43″N 121°11′36″E

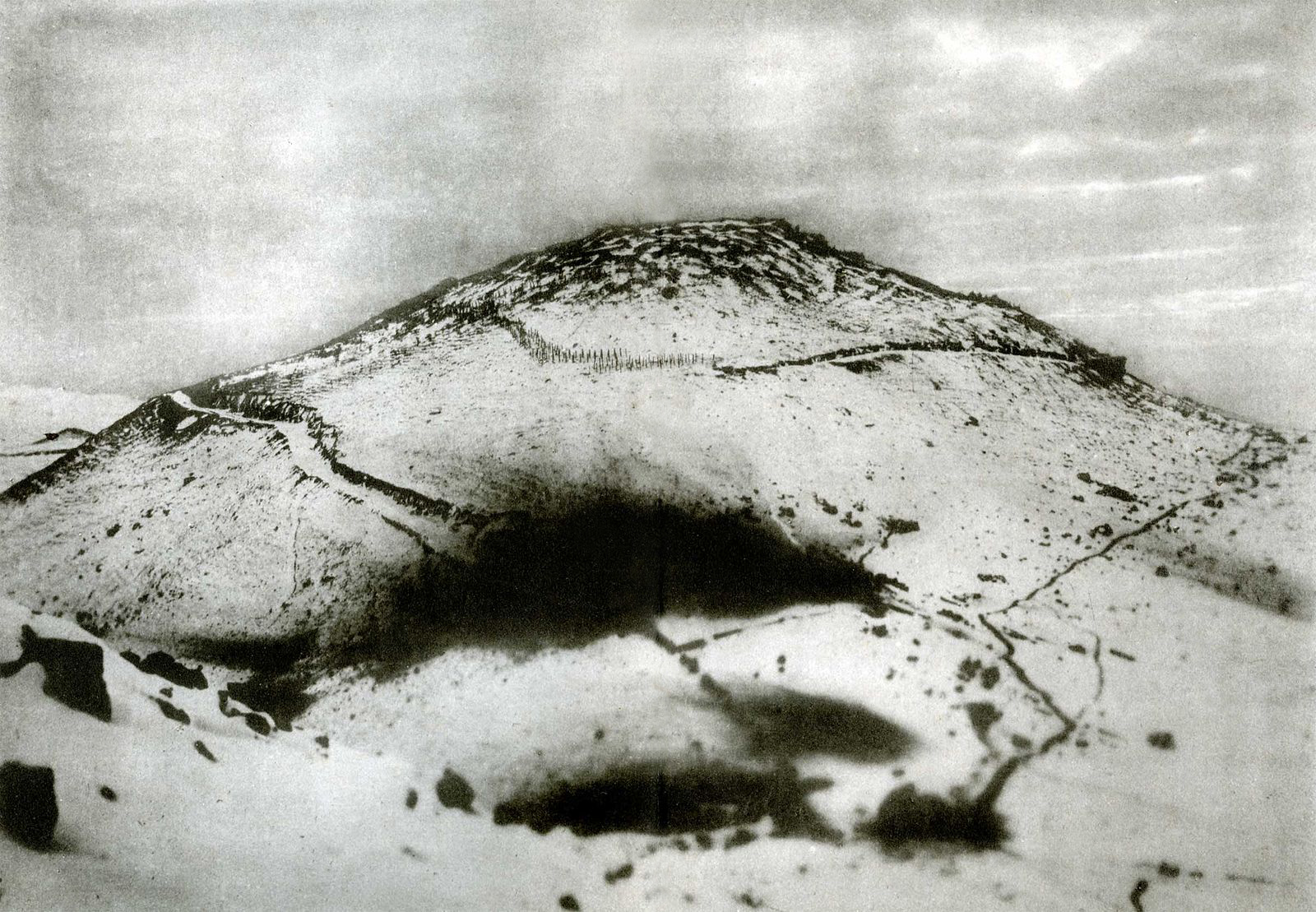
203 Meter Hill, December 14, 1904

Hill 203 (Japanese: 二〇三高地, Russian: Гора Высокая or Mount Vysokaya, Chinese: 二零三高地) is a high ground located in Lushunkou District, Dalian, Liaoning Province, China. In 1904-1905, one of the fiercest battles was fought between the Japanese and Russian armies in the Siege of Port Arthur, during the Russo-Japanese War.

It is so named because it is 203 metres (666 ft) above sea level.

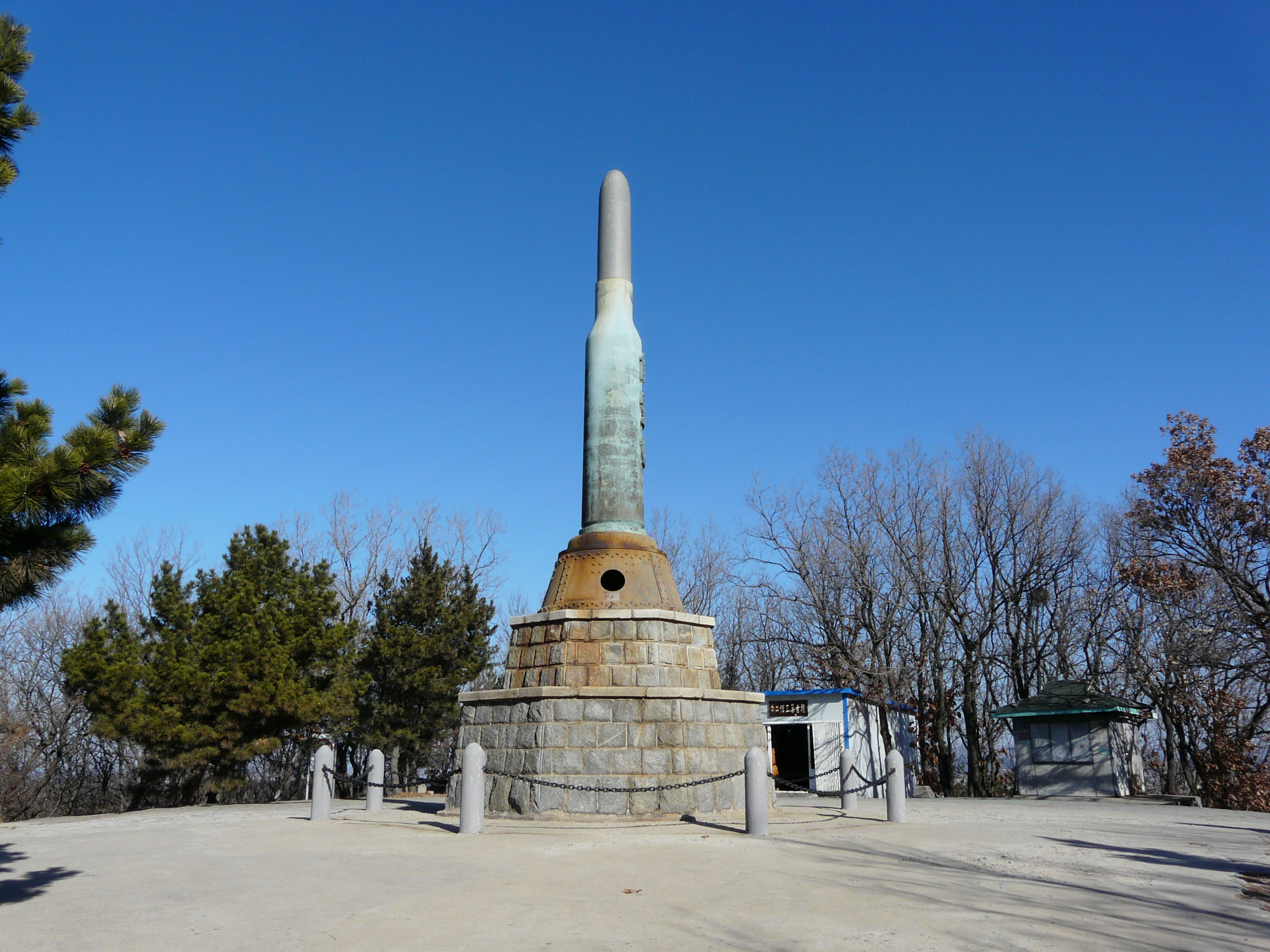
Surviving monument on Hill 203, depicting an 6.5×50mmSR Arisaka cartridge

Japanese General Maresuke Nogi used kanji with the same pronunciation but a different meaning to name it "Thee (you)-Spirits Mountain" (in Chinese: 爾靈山; Erlingshan) in a famous poem written after the battle, in which his son died:

爾靈山

爾靈山嶮豈難攀
男子功名期克艱
鐵血覆山山形改
萬人齊仰爾靈山

Translation:
Nireisan

Nireisan was indeed difficult to climb,
But it was overcome by the deeds of young men.
Under a mantle of iron and blood, the mountain's shape is changed.
Now all look up in awe at Nireisan.

== Cherry Blossom Park ==
In 1993, the Japan-China Friendship Exchange Support Association for Children donated 1,300 cherry blossom trees to Dalian City, which were planted at the foot of the South Peak of Hill 203. Since 1998, the local area began to hold the annual "Cherry Blossom Journey" event. Since 2005, it has been upgraded to Dalian Lushun Cherry Blossom Festival. 203 Highland Cherry Blossom Garden is one of the venues. In April 2009, the 203 Highland New Cherry Blossom Garden was opened. The new Garden covers an area of more than 500,000 square meters and has more than 3700 cherry blossoms of 18 varieties.

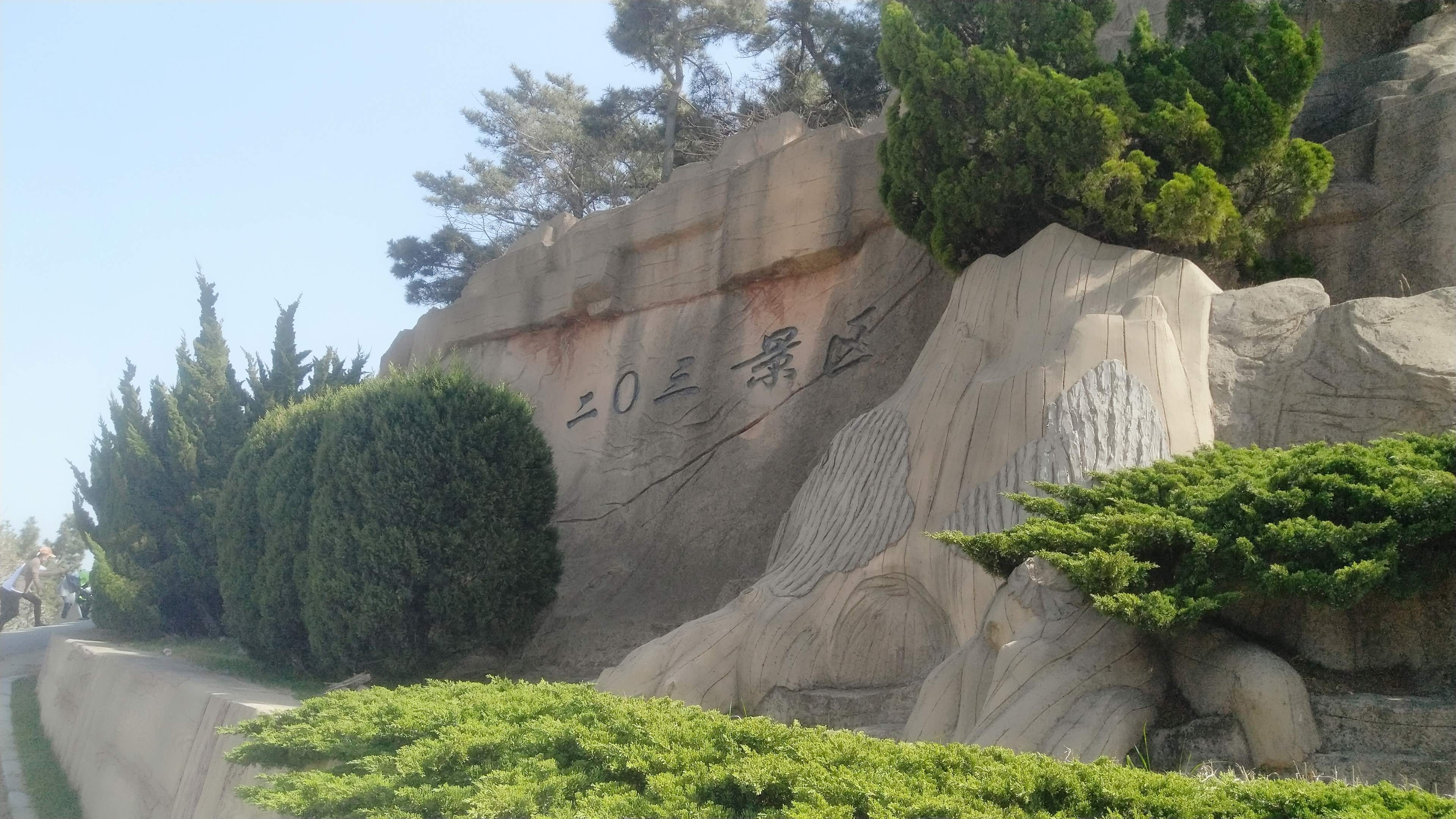
The entrance to Hill 203

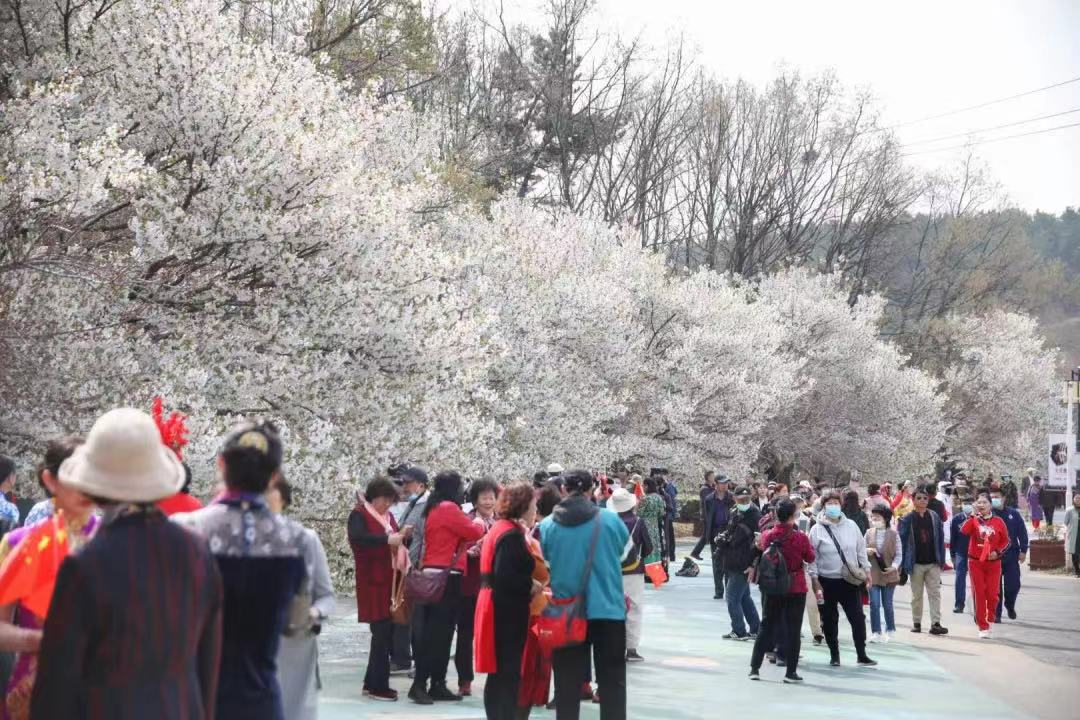
Visitors to Hill 203 Cherry Blossom Park

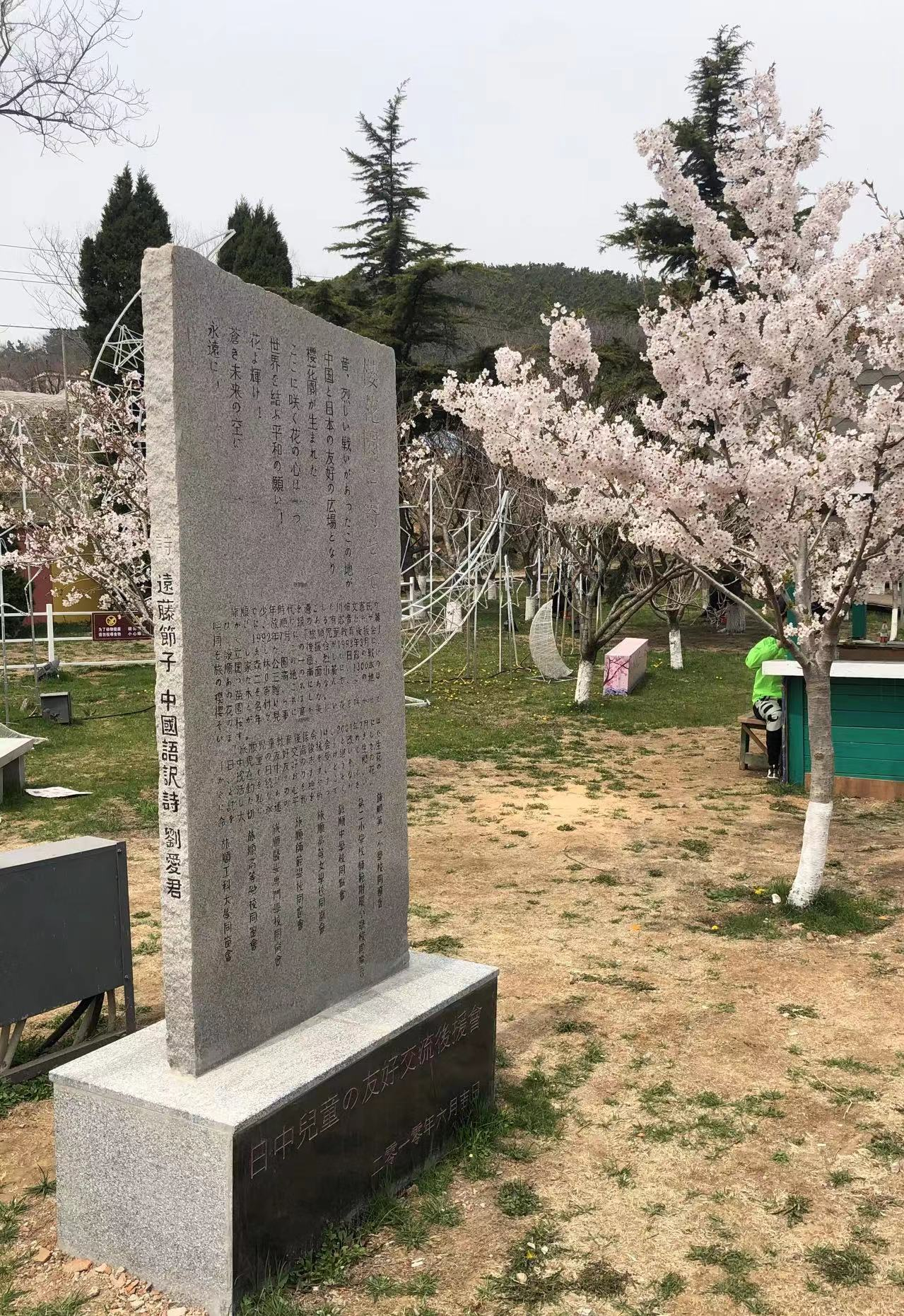
The Stele shows the Sino-Japanese Children's Friendship Exchange

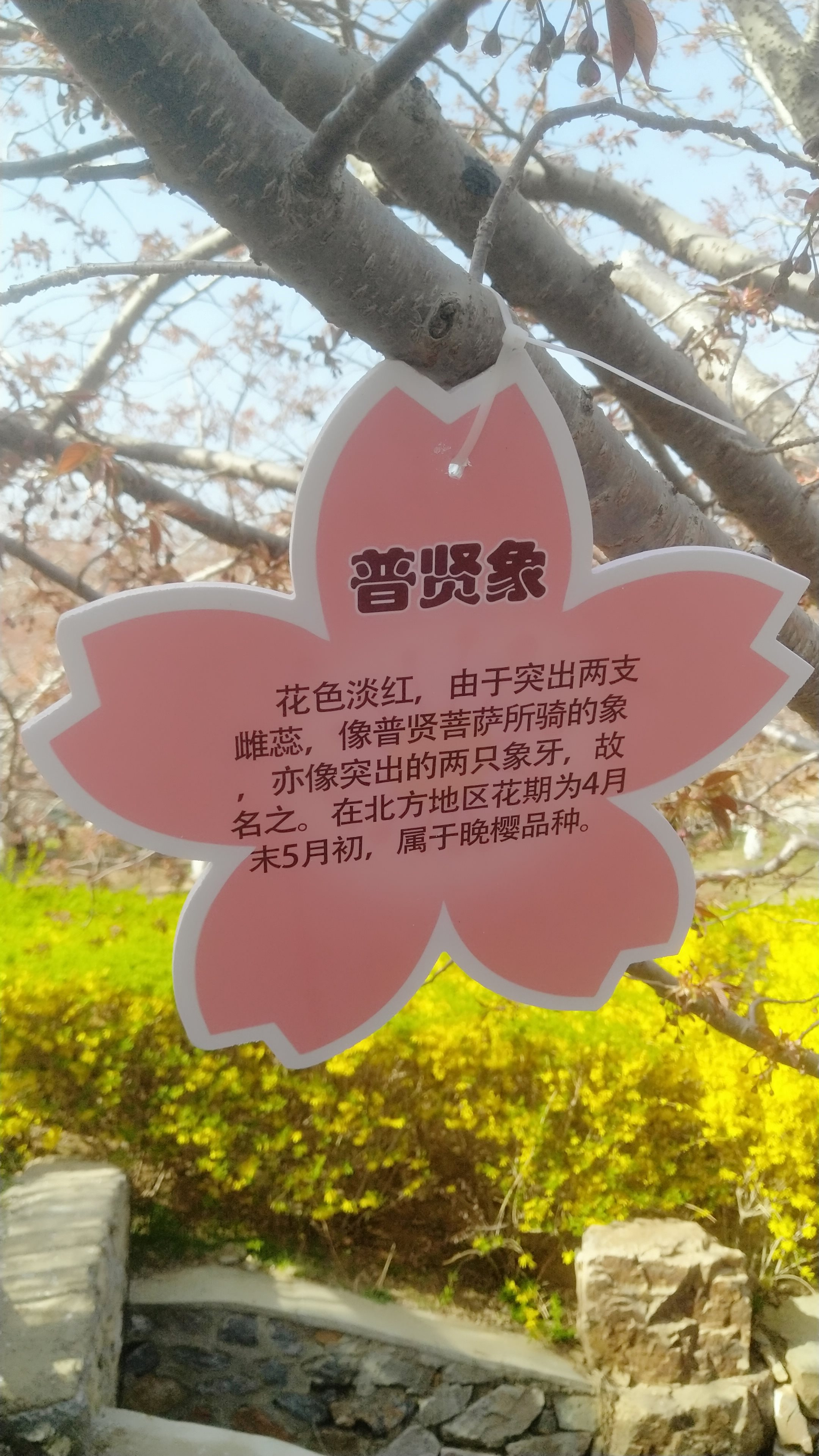
Fugenzo cherry (普賢象)

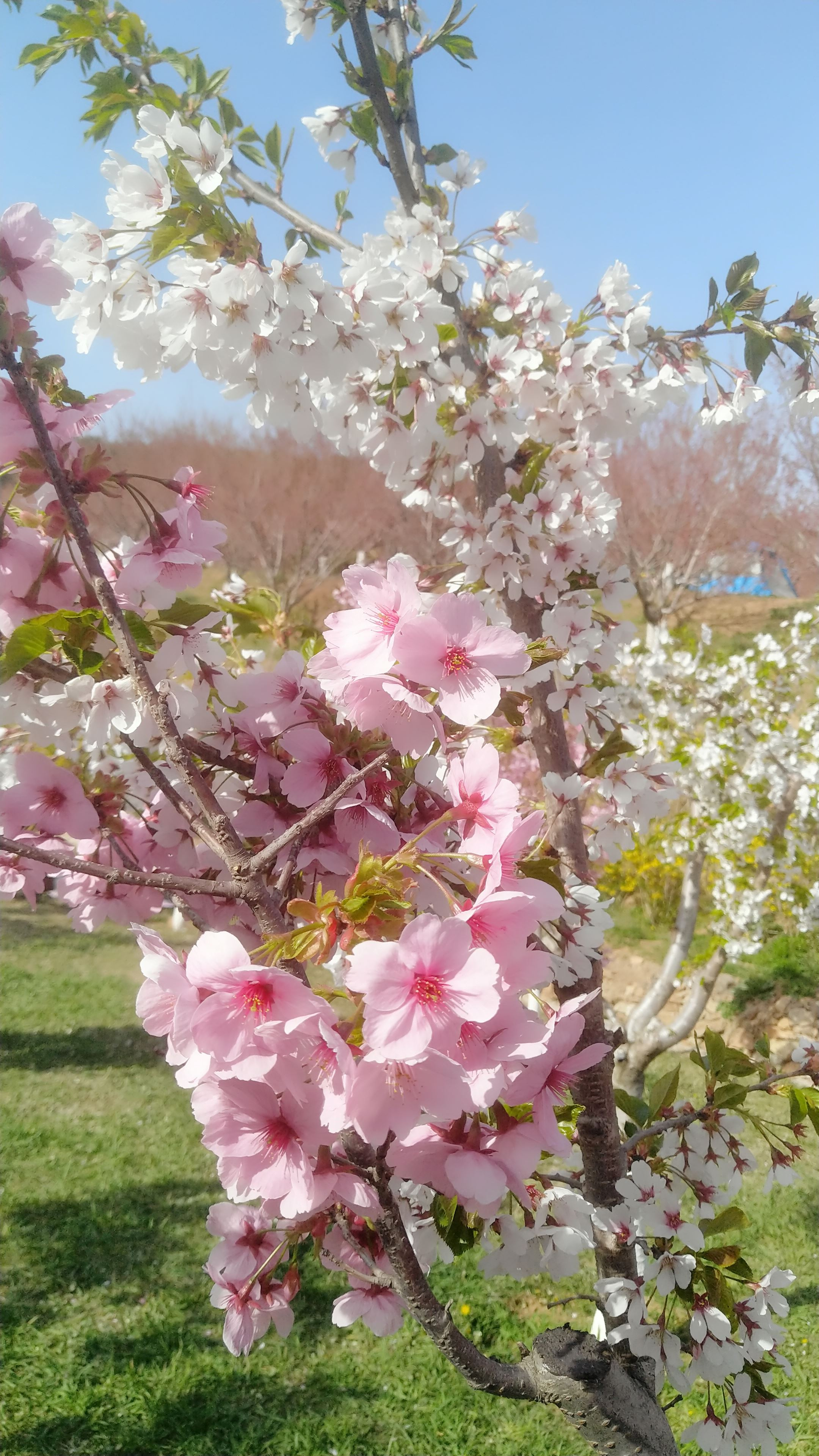
Cherry Blossoms at Hill 203

== See also ==
- Dalian
- Lushunkou District
- Russo-Japanese War
- Siege of Port Arthur
- The Battle of Port Arthur
