= Liaoning University of International Business and Economics =

University in Dalian, China

- 辽宁对外经贸学院 (Chinese)
- Type: Public university
- Location: Dalian, Liaoning, China
- Website: Official Website

Chinese name
- Simplified Chinese: 辽宁对外经贸学院
- Traditional Chinese: 遼寧對外經貿學院
Transcriptions
Standard Mandarin
- Hanyu Pinyin: Liáoníng Duìwài Jīngmào Xuéyuàn

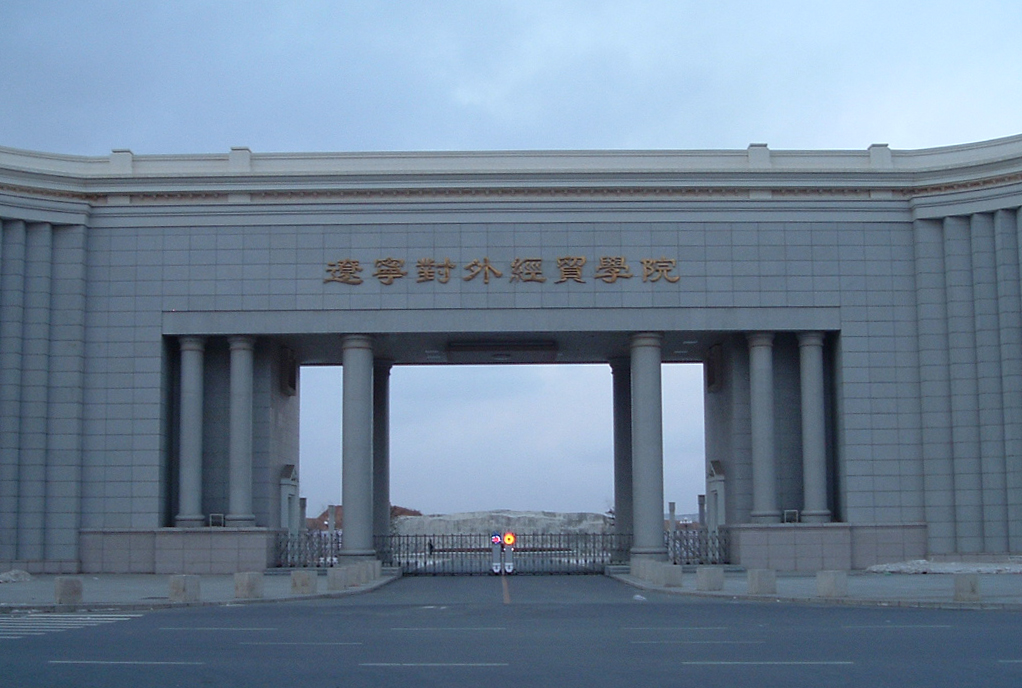
The Entrance to Liaoning University of International Business and Economics

The Liaoning University of International Business and Economics (Chinese: 辽宁对外经贸学院; lit. 'Liaoning Foreign Economics and Trade College') is a public college in Lushunkou, Dalian, Liaoning, China. It is affiliated with and funded by the Liaoning Provincial Department of Education.

Address: No. 33, Shunle Street, Lushun Economic Development Zone, Dalian City, Liaoning Province 116052

== See also ==
- University of International Business and Economics, Beijing
