= Airpod =

Airpod may refer to:

- AIRPod, a car that runs on compressed air
- AirPods, wireless earbuds manufactured by Apple Inc.
- AirPods Pro, wireless earbuds manufactured by Apple Inc.
- AirPods Max, wireless headphones manufactured by Apple Inc.
