= Apple headphones =

Lineup of products manufactured by Apple, Inc.

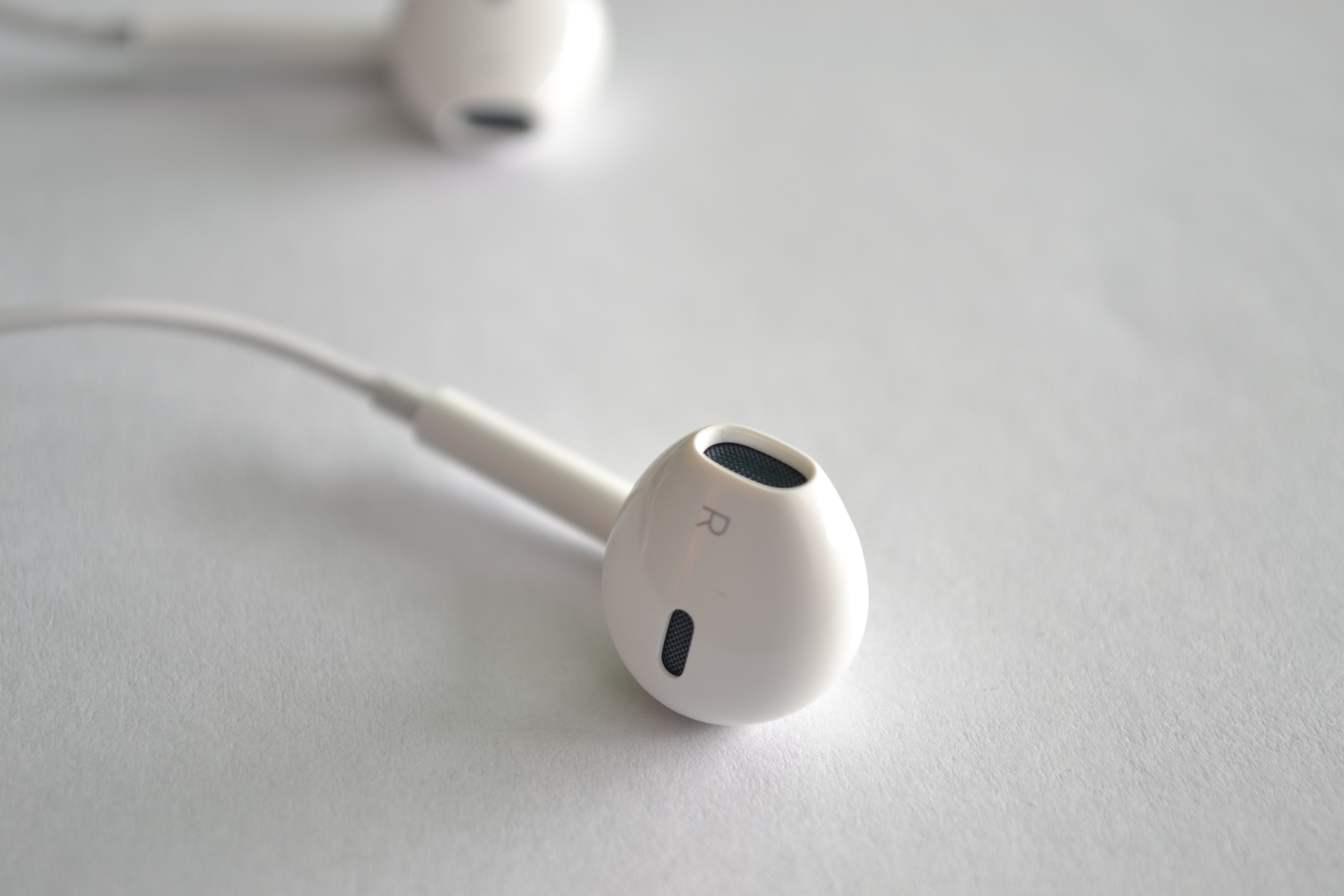
Apple EarPods, introduced on September 12, 2012

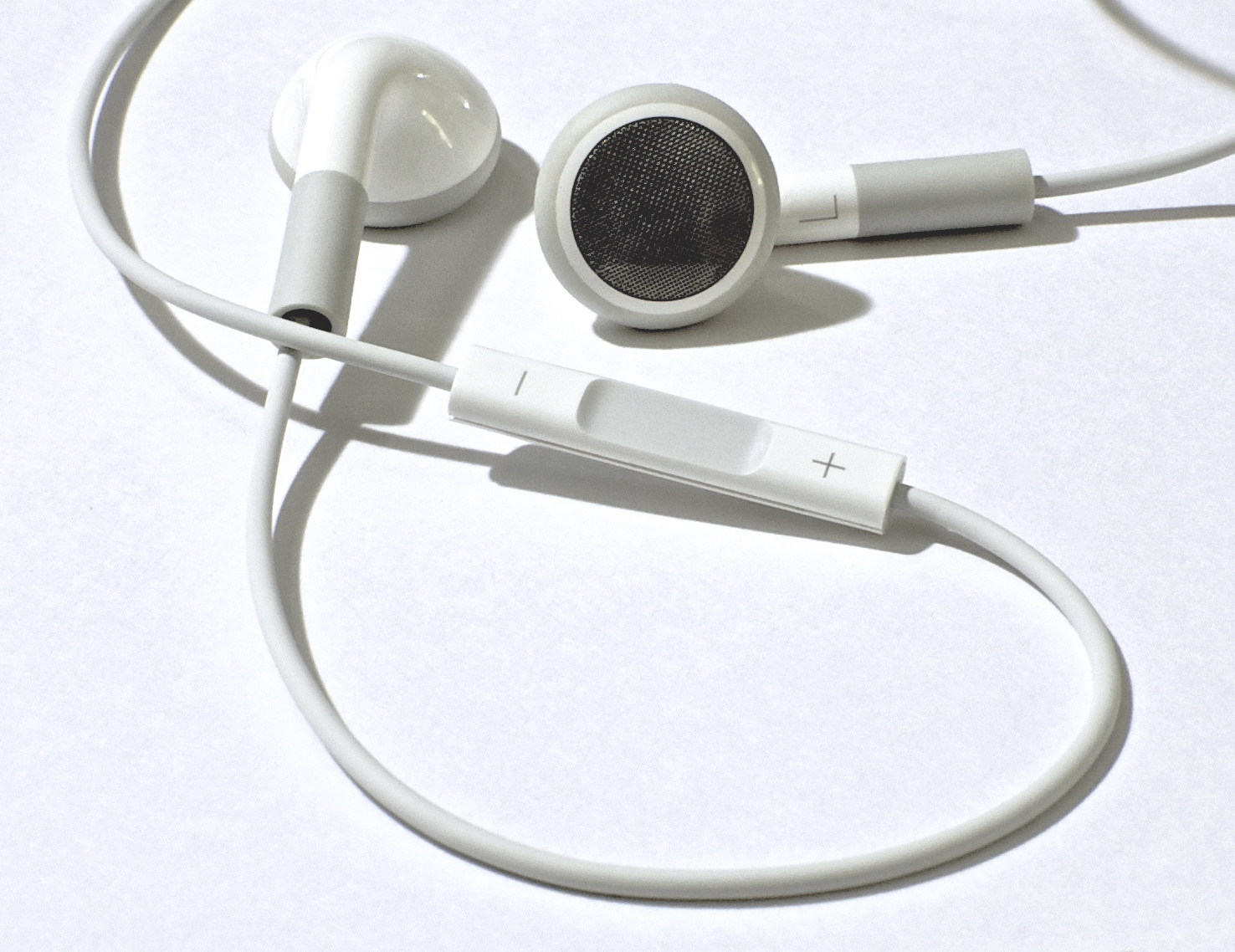
Earbuds that shipped with the second generation iPod Touch and third generation iPod Shuffle

Apple Inc. has produced and sold headphones since 2001, available for standalone purchase and bundled with iPhone (until 2020) and iPod (until 2022) products. Apple's current product line consists of EarPods (wired earbuds available with a 3.5mm headphone, Lightning connector, and USB-C), AirPods and AirPods Pro (wireless Bluetooth earbuds), and AirPods Max (wireless Bluetooth over-ear headphones). The idea for modern Apple headphones, specifically the AirPods, came from a team led by Bart André, Jonathan Ive, and Richard Howarth, under the vision of Steve Jobs.

== Wired headphones ==
=== Classic round earbuds ===
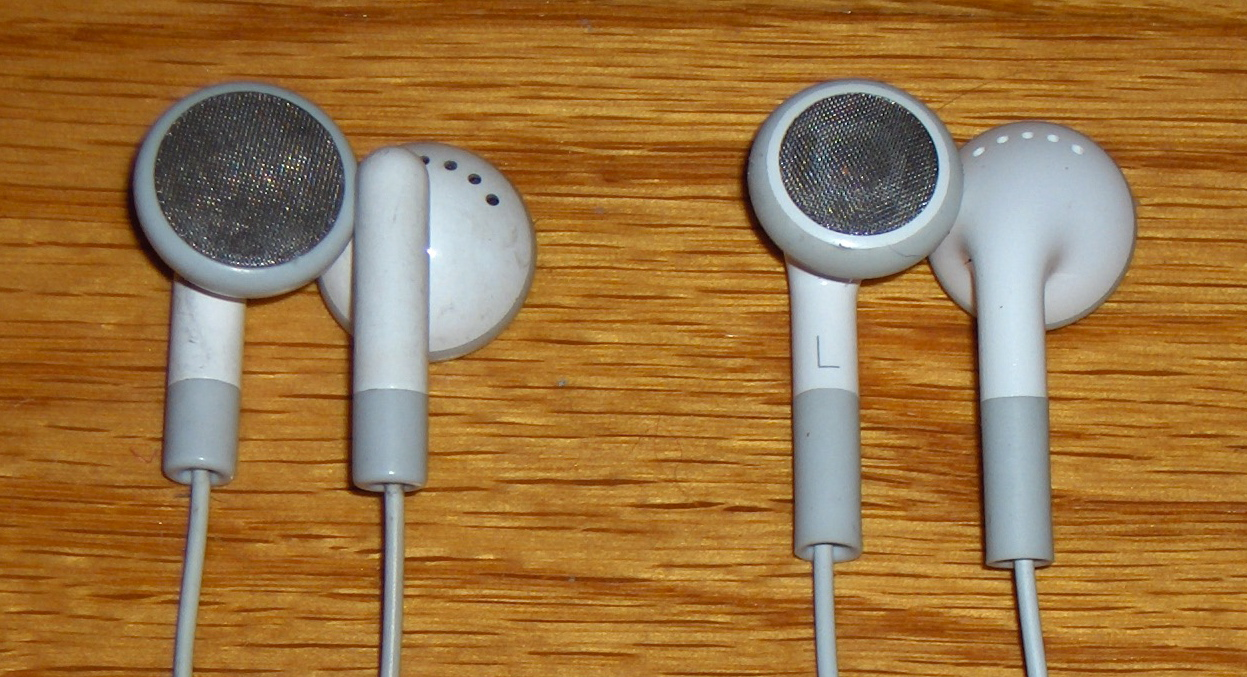
Comparison of early and later iPod earphones

Apple's original earphones shipped with the original iPod, released on October 23, 2001. They were never given a formal name and were referred to variously as "iPod headphones" and "the iPod's earbud-style headphones". They were bundled with two pairs of foam covers. The second generation added a plastic slider to allow the user to limit the gap between the wires. The third generation were redesigned with a slightly longer strain relief, a slightly smaller speaker grill, and the left/right marking being moved from the outside to the inside.

=== iPhone Stereo Headset ===
The iPhone Stereo Headset was introduced in 2007 and was bundled with the original iPhone and iPhone 3G, and featured a control capsule in-line with the left earbud's wire with a microphone and a single button, actuated by squeezing the unit, which can be programmed to control calls, presentations, music and video playback, launch Siri, or take pictures with the Camera application. There was also a version without the microphone that was rarer. There have been many reports of moisture problems with the remote/mic.

=== iPod In-Ear Headphones ===
iPod In-Ear Headphones were introduced in January 2004 as premium headphones compared to those bundled with iPods, and were available for $39. They included three different sized plastic caps, and Apple claimed improved sound quality and bass response. They were discontinued in 2008.

=== Apple Earphones with Remote and Mic ===
Apple Earphones with Remote and Mic were introduced in 2009 and were bundled with the iPhone 3GS, iPhone 4, iPhone 4S, the third-generation iPod Touch, and sold independently. They expanded on the iPhone Stereo Headset by adding two other buttons dedicated to volume control. A variant without a microphone shipped only with the third-generation iPod shuffle.

=== Apple In-Ear Headphones ===
Apple In-Ear Headphones were introduced on September 9, 2008, intended as a premium option compared to Apple's bundled earbuds. Like the regular earbuds they have a remote control and microphone built-in. They add silicone ear tips and dual balanced armature drivers advertised as "engineered for superior acoustic accuracy, balance, and clarity". The remote and protective case was redesigned on September 12, 2012, with the remote matching that of EarPods. Apple has since removed them from their online store.

=== EarPods ===
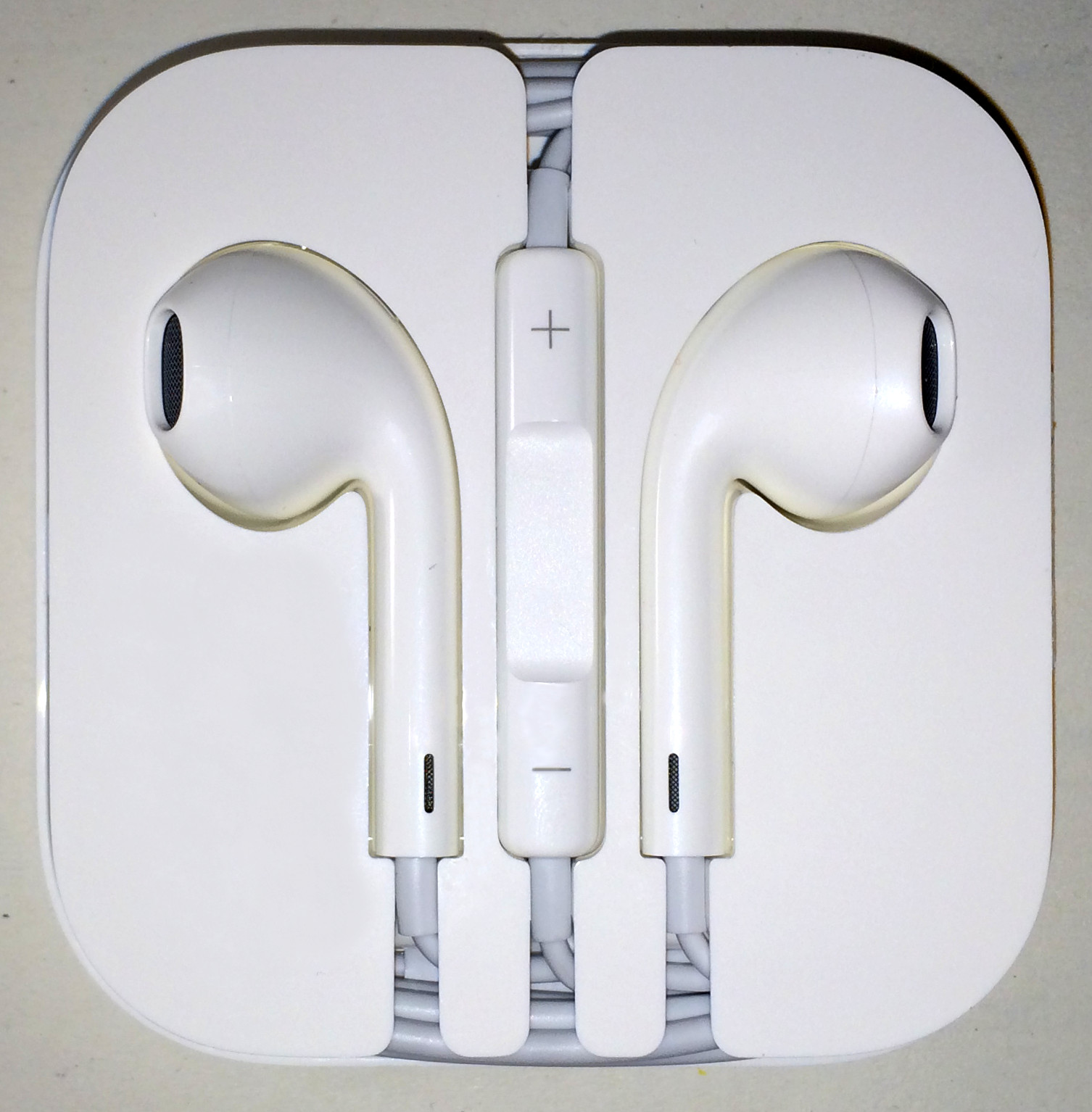
Apple EarPods in their box

EarPods were introduced in September 2012 alongside the iPhone 5 and replaced Apple's earlier circular earbuds. EarPods are characterised by an asymmetric, contoured design intended to better fit the human ear and improve comfort and sound performance. The EarPods are available in three connector options: 3.5mm headphone, Lightning and USB-C. EarPods were previously bundled with various iPhone models from 2012 to 2020.

=== 3.5mm Headphone Jack Adapter ===
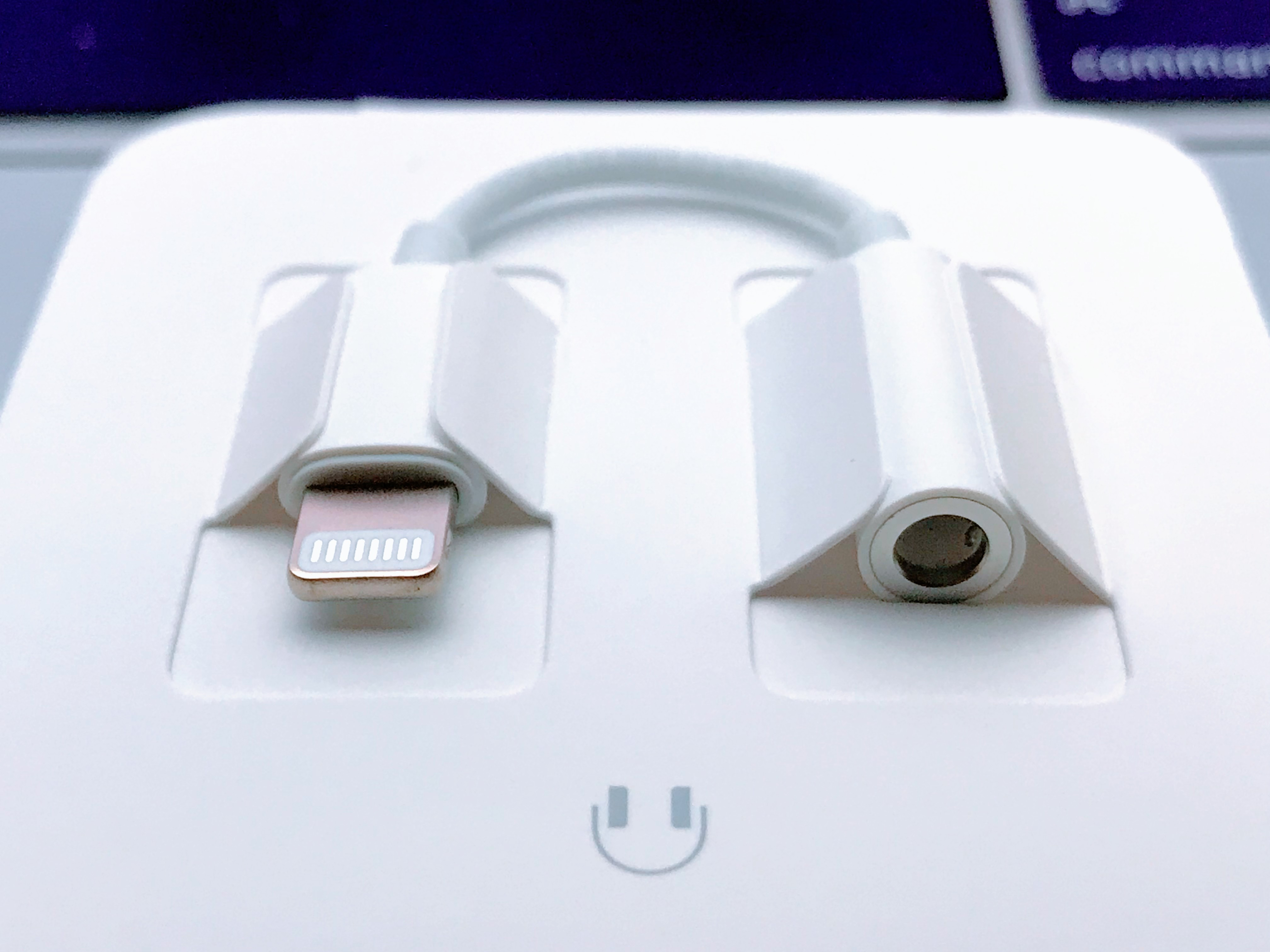
Apple's iPhone 7 and newer models lack a headphone jack (released in September 2016), and until September 12, 2018, included a Lightning to 3.5mm dongle.

iPhone models from the iPhone 7 to the iPhone X also shipped with a Lightning-to-3.5mm headphone jack adapter, enabling customers to connect 3.5mm headphones to a Lightning port. Thanks to an iOS update (iOS 10.3), it is backwards compatible, meaning it can be used with any previous device with a Lightning port (from iPhone 5 onwards). It is no longer included as of the iPhone XS and iPhone XR, but remains available for purchase from Apple and third-party retailers.

Since 2024, the Lightning-to-3.5mm headphone jack adapter has been discontinued in favor of transitioning from the Lightning connector to the USB-C connector

A USB-C-to-3.5mm headphone jack adapter was introduced in 2018 alongside the third-generation iPad Pro, which uses the USB-C connector. It is also intended for use with the iPhone 15 series and later, which also use the USB-C connector.

== Wireless headphones ==
=== iPhone Bluetooth Headset ===
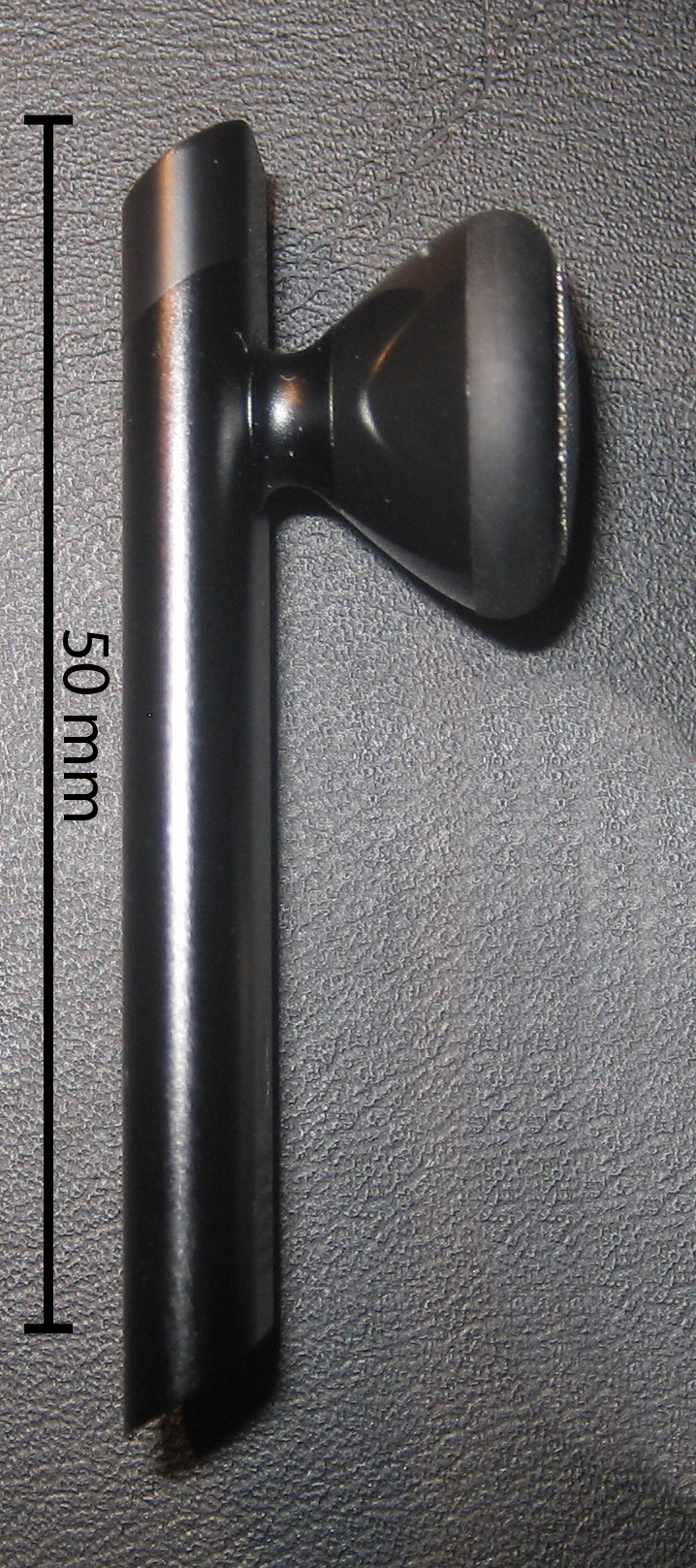
iPhone Bluetooth Headset

The iPhone Bluetooth Headset was introduced in 2007 priced at $129 and later reduced to $99. It was discontinued in 2009. It was designed for phone calls only and could not be used for listening to music. The integration included showing an icon for the headset and its battery level. It was bundled with a "Travel Cable" that charged it and a 30-pin iPhone simultaneously, and a docking station called the iPhone Dual Dock that could charge it and an original iPhone was also available.

=== AirPods ===
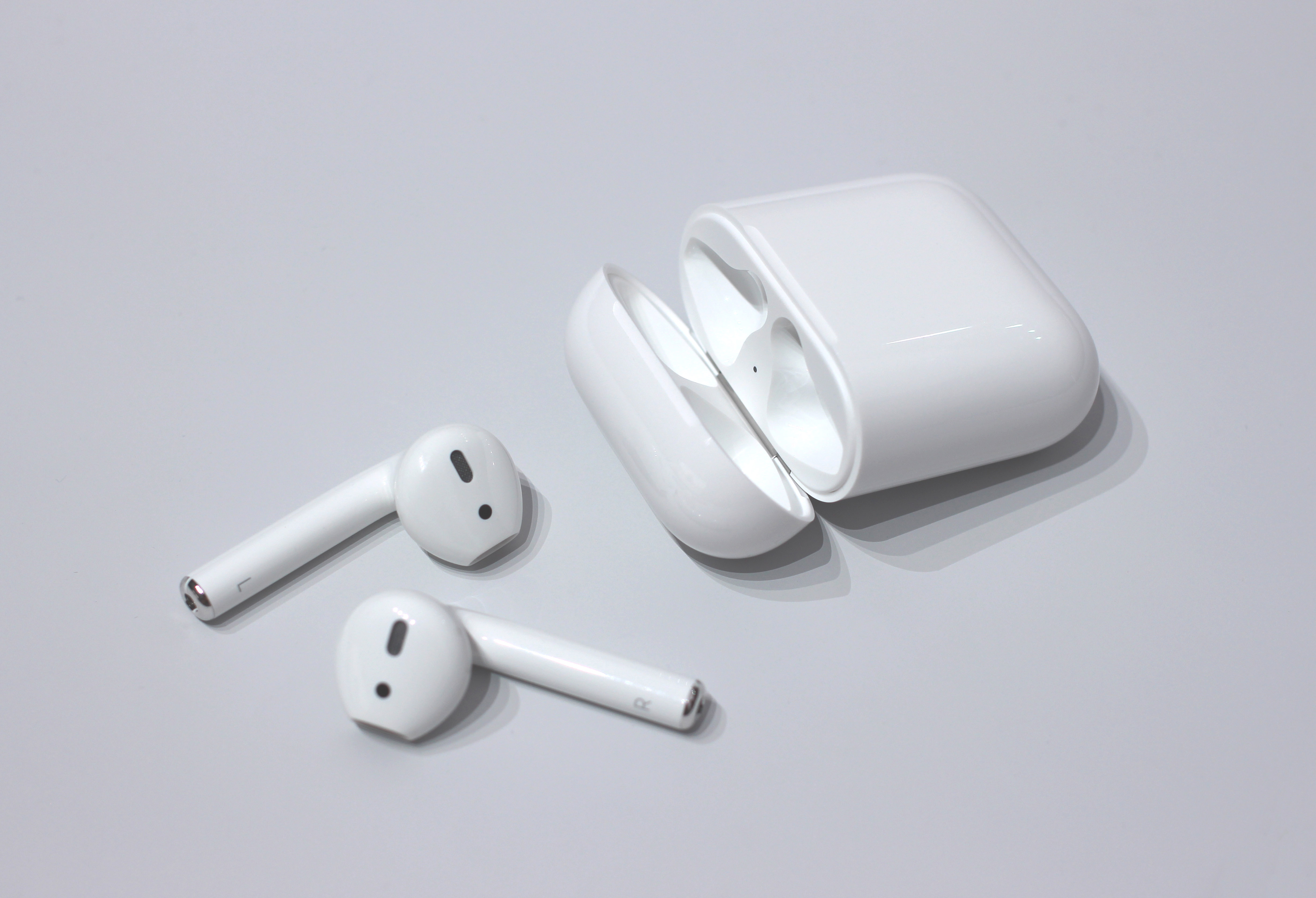
Apple AirPods and case

AirPods were announced alongside the iPhone 7 and were released on December 16, 2016. They are wireless earbud-style headphones with microphones, dual accelerometers, IR sensors used to pause music if they are not in the user's ears, and motion touch sensors that are used to activate controls. They are advertised as having a battery life of five hours, and come with a charging case that gives them a total of 24 hours of battery life. The original case is charged by Lightning, and in 2019 a second case was introduced with Qi charging. AirPods are compatible with iPhones, iPads, Apple Watches, Macs, the 6th generation iPod Touch, and the 7th generation iPod Nano, but automatic pairing with an iCloud account requires macOS Sierra, iOS 10, and watchOS. They are also compatible with devices on other platforms that support Bluetooth, but it limits the AirPods' functionality.

On September 9, 2024, following the announcement of the fourth-generation AirPods, and all-new advanced hearing aid features for AirPods Pro 2 and the updated AirPods Max with USB-C port, all the devices of the AirPods product line have been transitioned from the proprietary Lightning port to the universal USB-C port, making both the second-generation AirPods, third-generation AirPods and the original AirPods Max with Lightning port discontinued.

=== AirPods Pro ===
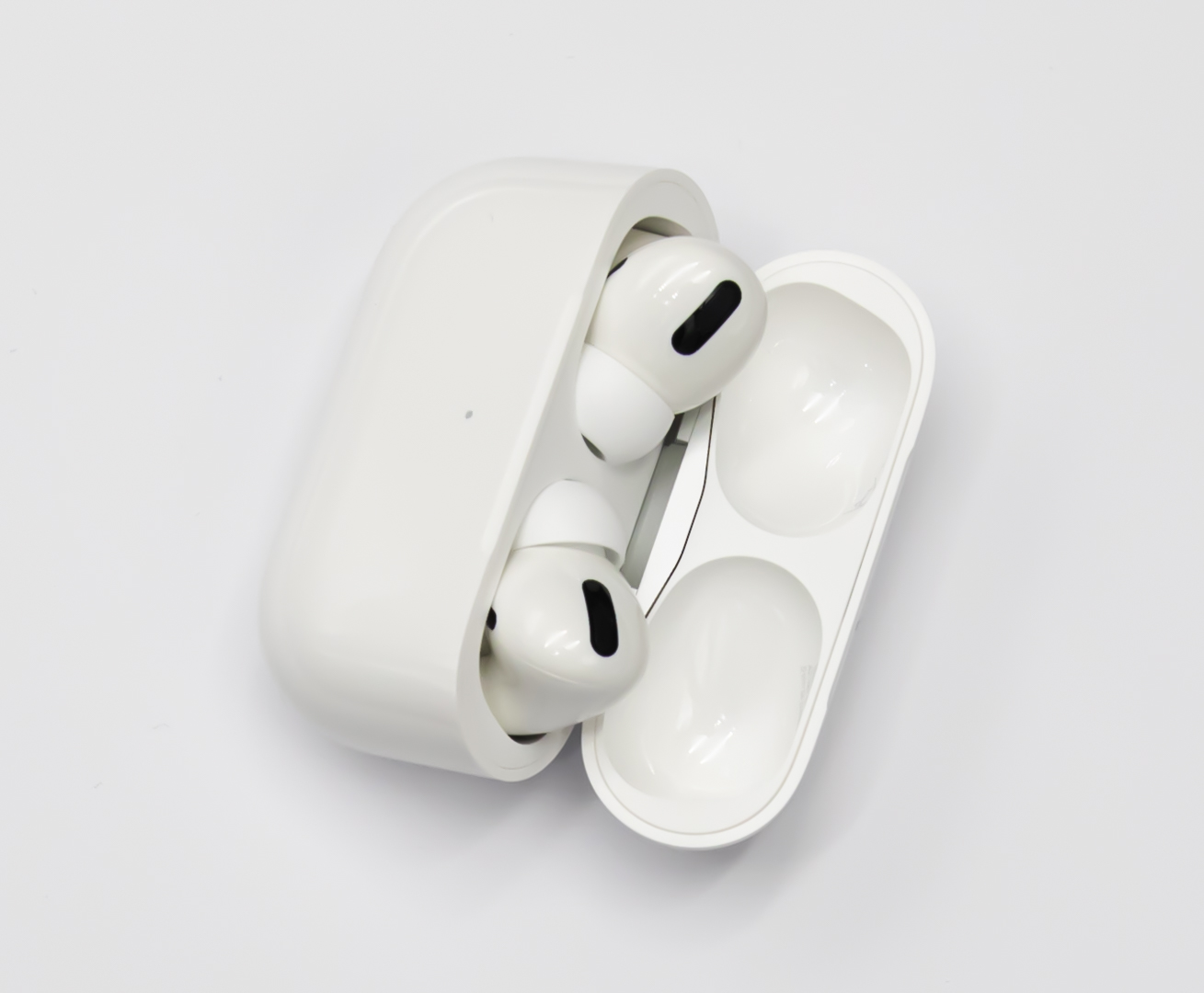
AirPods Pro and case

AirPods Pro were released on October 30, 2019, as a premium option compared to AirPods. They feature the same H1 chip found on the second-generation AirPods, and boast a slimmer design, control by pressing the force sensor on the stems instead of double tapping on the ear pieces, active noise cancellation, adaptive EQ, IPX4 water resistance, a new charging case with Qi standard, and include silicone tips.

On September 23, 2022, the AirPods Pro 2 was released. They feature the H2 chip, added swiping control for adjusting the volume, major improvement on the active noise cancellation, an increased battery life, the U1 chip that supports Find My tracking, built-in speaker for locating and status updates, added compatibility with the Apple Watch charger (in addition to the Qi standard wireless charging and wired Lightning connector charging), lanyard loop added to the side of the charging case and added extra-small silicone tip size (in addition to large, medium and small silicon tip sizes).

On September 22, 2023, alongside the launch of the iPhone 15 models and iPhone 15 Pro models, the updated AirPods Pro 2 features the improved IP54 dust resistance, added the support for lossless audio with the Apple Vision Pro, and a charging case with USB-C port instead of a Lightning port.

On September 9, 2024, following the announcement of the fourth-generation AirPods and the updated AirPods Max with USB-C port, Apple announced the all-new advanced hearing health features for the AirPods Pro 2.

=== AirPods Max ===
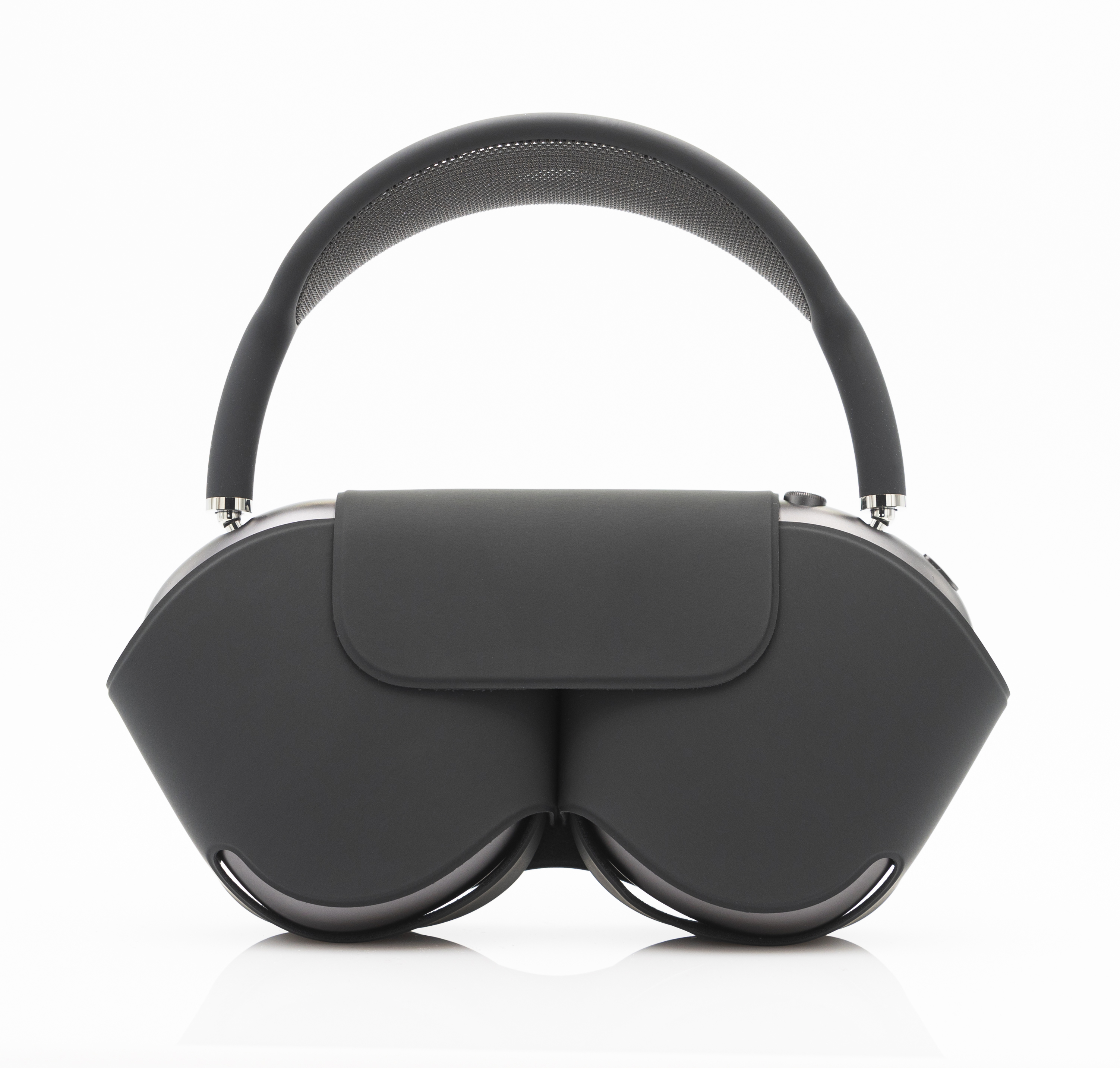
AirPods Max and Smart case

AirPods Max, released on December 15, 2020, are wireless Bluetooth over-ear headphones. They feature two H1 chips, active noise cancellation and transparency mode, a Digital Crown and on-head detection.

On September 9, 2024, AirPods Max replaced the Lightning port with a USB-C port.

== Technical specifications ==
Legend	Discontinued and unsupported	Discontinued but supported	Current	Upcoming

Comparative technical specifications of all AirPods models
Model			iPhone Bluetooth Headset	AirPods (1st gen)	AirPods (2nd gen)	AirPods Pro (1st gen)	AirPods Max (Lightning)	AirPods (3rd gen)	AirPods Pro (2nd gen)	AirPods 4	AirPods 4 with ANC	AirPods Max (USB-C)	AirPods Pro 3	AirPods Max 2	AirPods 5	AirPods 5 with Wireless Charging
Timeline	Announced		January 9, 2007	September 7, 2016	March 20, 2019	October 28, 2019	December 8, 2020	October 18, 2021	September 7, 2022	September 9, 2024			September 9, 2025	March 16, 2026	September 9, 2026	
Timeline	Released		June 29, 2007	December 13, 2016	March 20, 2019	October 30, 2019	December 15, 2020	October 26, 2021	September 23, 2022	September 20, 2024			September 19, 2025	April 1, 2026	September 18, 2026	
Timeline	Discontinued		March 23, 2009	March 20, 2019	September 9, 2024	September 7, 2022	September 9, 2024	September 9, 2024	September 9, 2025	September 9, 2026		March 16, 2026	In production			
Model	Model number	L	A1221	A1722	A2031	A2084	A2096	A2564	A2931, A2699, A2698 (Lightning); A3047, A3048, A3049 (USB-C)	A3053, A3050, A3054	A3056, A3055, A3057	A3184	A3063, A3064, A3065	A3454	A3531, A3532, A3533	A3439, A3440, A3441
Model	Model number	R	A1221	A1523	A2032	A2083	A2096	A2565	A2931, A2699, A2698 (Lightning); A3047, A3048, A3049 (USB-C)	A3053, A3050, A3054	A3056, A3055, A3057	A3184	A3063, A3064, A3065	A3454	A3531, A3532, A3533	A3439, A3440, A3441
Model	Model number	Case	A1221	A1602 (Lightning)	A1602 (Lightning); A1938 (Qi, Lightning)	A2190 (Qi, Lightning); A2190 (MagSafe, Lightning)	A2096	A2897 (Lightning); A2566 (MagSafe, Lightning)	A2700 (MagSafe, Lightning); A2968 (MagSafe, USB-C)	A3058 (USB-C)	A3059 (Qi, USB-C)	A3184	A3122	A3454	A3529 (USB-C)	A3530 (Qi, USB-C)
Model	Model identifier		[data missing]	AirPods1,1	AirPods2,1	AirPodsPro1,1; AirPods2,2 iProd8,1	AirPodsMax1,1 iProd8,6	AirPods1,3; Audio2,1	AirPodsPro1,2; AirPods3,1	AirPods1,4; AirPods3,2	AirPods1,5; AirPods3,3	AirPodsMax1,1	AirPodsPro1,3; AirPods3,4	AirPodsMax1,2; AirPods3,6	AirPods3,7	AirPods3,8
Model	Order numbers		MA817AM (with iPhone dual dock); MB536AM (without iPhone dual dock)	MMEF2AM	MV7N2AM (Lightning); MRXJ2AM (Qi)	MWP22AM	MGYJ3AM (silver); MGYH3AM (space gray); MGYL3AM (sky blue); MGYM3AM (pink); MGYN3AM (green)	MME73AM	MQD83AM (Lightning); MTJV3AM (USB-C)	MXP63LL	MXP93LL	MWW43AM (midnight); MWW53AM (starlight); MWW63AM (blue); MWW73AM (orange); MWW83AM (purple)	MFHP4LL	MHWK4AM (midnight); MHWL4AM (starlight); MHWM4AM (blue); MHWN4AM (orange); MHWP4AM (purple)	MKFW4LL	MKFT4LL
Compatibility	Bluetooth		Bluetooth 2.0	Bluetooth 4.0	Bluetooth 5.0				Bluetooth 5.3			Bluetooth 5.0	Bluetooth 5.3			
Compatibility	OS support for Siri		—N/a	iOS 10 watchOS 3 macOS Sierra	iOS 12.2 watchOS 5.2 macOS Mojave 10.14.4	iOS 13.2 watchOS 6.1 tvOS 13.2 macOS Catalina 10.15.1	iOS 14.3 iPadOS 14.3 watchOS 7.2 tvOS 14 macOS Big Sur	iOS 15.1 iPadOS 15.1 watchOS 8.1 tvOS 15.1 macOS Monterey 12.0								
System on a chip			None	Apple W1 chip	Apple H1 chip				Apple H2 chip			Apple H1 chip	Apple H2 chip			
Battery	Power	Per AirPod	[data missing]	0.093 Wh		0.16 Wh	2 × 2.53 Wh (right ear cup)	0.133 Wh	0.182 Wh	0.123 Wh		2 × 2.53 Wh (right ear cup)	0.221 Wh	2 × 2.53 Wh (right ear cup)	0.123 Wh	0.135 Wh
Battery	Power	Case	[data missing]	1.52 Wh		1.98 Wh	2 × 2.53 Wh (right ear cup)	1.327 Wh	1.997 Wh	1.329 Wh		2 × 2.53 Wh (right ear cup)	1.334 Wh	2 × 2.53 Wh (right ear cup)	1.329 Wh	
Battery	Capacity		No case	398 mAh (case)		519 mAh (case)	664 mAh (right ear cup)	345 mAh (case)	523 mAh (case); 2 × 49.7 mAh (earbuds)	345 mAh (case)		664 mAh (right ear cup)	344.53 mAh (case); 2 × 58 mAh (earbuds)	664 mAh (right ear cup)	345 mAh (case)	
Firmware	Original release		Not upgradable	3.3.1	1A661	2B576	3B71	4B52	5A374	7A295		7A291	8A354	8E246	9A350	
Firmware	Latest / final		Not upgradable	6.8.8	6F21	6F21	6F25	6F21	9B47	9B47		7E108	9B47	9B47	9B47	
Introductory US Price			$129	$159	$159	$249	$549	$179	$249	$129	$179	$549	$249	$549	$129	$149

== In popular culture ==
Apple's white earbuds are prominently featured in the majority of their distinctive "silhouette style" iPod advertisements. Most often as a dancing black figure in Silhouette with a starkly contrasted white earbuds and cord while holding a white iPod. The background is usually another bright colour so the iPod and headphones clearly stand out compared to the rest of the image.

== See also ==
- Timeline of Apple Inc. products
- Apple speakers
