= AirPods Max =

Wireless headphones produced by Apple

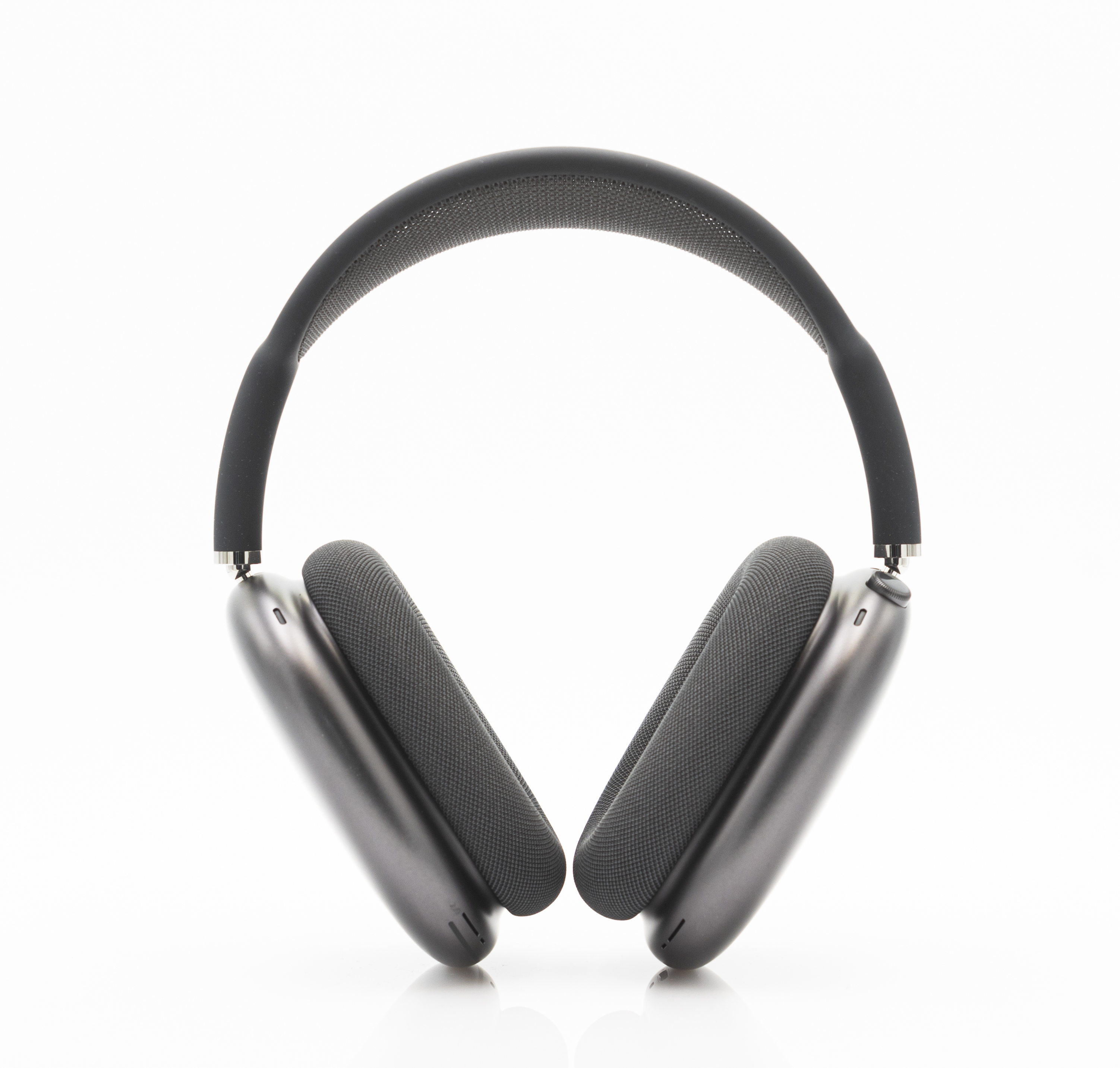
- AirPods Max in Space Gray
- Developer: Apple Inc.
- Manufacturer: Luxshare (on contract), Goertek (on contract)
- Product family: AirPods
- Type: Wireless headphones
- Released: 1st generation with Lightning: December 15, 2020; 5 years ago; 1st generation with USB-C: September 20, 2024; 2 years ago; 2nd generation: April 1, 2026; 7 months ago
- Introductory price: US$549.00
- Discontinued: 1st generation with Lightning: September 9, 2024; 1st generation with USB-C: March 16, 2026
- System on a chip: Apple H1 (1st generation) (each ear cup); Apple H2 (2nd generation) (each ear cup)
- Input: Nine microphones, optical sensor (each ear cup), position sensor (each ear cup), case-detect sensor (each ear cup), accelerometer (each ear cup), gyroscope (left ear cup)
- Connectivity: Bluetooth 5.0 (1st generation); Bluetooth 5.3 (2nd generation); Lightning port (before September 20, 2024) or USB-C port (after September 20, 2024) for charging and audio line-in via USB and 3.5mm jack
- Current firmware: AirPods Max Lightning: 6F25; AirPods Max USB-C : 7E108; AirPods Max 2 : 8E258
- Dimensions: AirPods: 6.64 x 3.28 x 7.37 in (168.6 x 83.4 x 187.3 mm)
- Weight: AirPods; 13.6 ounces (384.8 g); Charging case 4.74 ounces (134.5 g)
- Model Number: AirPods Max 2 Model number: A3454; Year introduced: 2026; AirPods Max 1 (USB-C); Model number: A3184; Year introduced: 2024; AirPods Max 1 (Lightning); Model number: A2096; Year introduced: 2020
- Related: AirPods, AirPods Pro
- Website: apple.com/airpods-max

AirPods Max are wireless Bluetooth over-ear headphones designed by Apple, first released on December 15, 2020. They are Apple's highest-end option in the AirPods lineup, sold alongside the base model AirPods and mid-range AirPods Pro.

The main changes of the AirPods Max over the mid-range AirPods Pro are the over-ear design with larger speakers, inclusion of Apple's Digital Crown (found on the Apple Watch and Apple Vision Pro), more color options, and longer battery life. An updated version of the first generation model with USB-C charging was released on September 20, 2024.

Apple released a second-generation model, with the H2 chip, in April 2026.

== Models ==
=== First generation ===
Apple announced the first generation AirPods Max on December 8, 2020, via a press release, and released them on December 15, 2020. AirPods Max features an over-ear headphone design, introduced under the leadership of CEO Tim Cook and the company's product marketing team. Among those credited with their development were Apple's lead designers, along with Rayan Rechka, who was noted for his contributions to the color finishes of the headphones.

AirPods Max feature an H1 chip in each ear cup, which is also found in the second-generation AirPods and first-generation AirPods Pro. AirPods Max, like the AirPods Pro, come with Apple's Active Noise Cancellation technology for blocking outside noise, and Transparency mode for listening to sounds around users. The "Digital Crown", similar to that of the Apple Watch, allows users to play or pause audio, control volume, skip tracks, control phone calls, and activate Siri. Proximity sensors automatically detect when they are on a user's head and play or pause audio accordingly. Spatial audio uses built-in gyroscopes and accelerometers to track movement of the user's head and provide what Apple describes as a "theater-like" experience.

Apple claims 20 hours of battery life, with five minutes of charging delivering 1.5 hours of listening time. AirPods Max are charged via the Lightning port. The Lightning port can also be used for line-in audio, with Apple selling cables with USB-A, USB-C and 3.5mm headphone ends.

AirPods Max are bundled with a Smart Case for storing. The Smart Case includes magnets that switch AirPods Max to low-power mode.

AirPods Max are available in five colors: Space Gray, Silver, Sky Blue, Green, and Pink. Users can select from these five colors for each of the ear cushions and the external chassis.

==== USB-C version ====
Apple announced an updated version of the first generation AirPods Max on September 9, 2024, at a special event and released them on September 20, 2024. They feature a USB-C port for data and charging and come in new colors: Midnight, Starlight, Blue, Purple, and Orange. Support for lossless and ultra‑low latency audio was added in iOS/iPadOS 18.4 and macOS Sequoia 15.4 for the USB-C models when connected to a device using a USB-C cable. They support up to 24-bit/48 kHz lossless audio.

=== Second generation ===
Apple announced the AirPods Max 2 on March 16, 2026, which added the H2 chip and Bluetooth 5.3. They were released on April 1, 2026. They feature improved sound quality and active noise cancellation along with new additions including live translation, adaptive audio, audio recording, voice isolation and using Siri via head gestures. The second-generation also supports lossless audio over a USB-C connection.

== Compatibility ==
AirPods Max are compatible with any device that supports Bluetooth, including Android and Windows devices, although certain features such as Siri require an Apple device running iOS 14.3, iPadOS 14.3, watchOS 7.2, tvOS 14 or macOS Big Sur.

Legend	Discontinued and unsupported	Discontinued but supported	Current	Upcoming

Comparative technical specifications of all AirPods models
Model			iPhone Bluetooth Headset	AirPods (1st gen)	AirPods (2nd gen)	AirPods Pro (1st gen)	AirPods Max (Lightning)	AirPods (3rd gen)	AirPods Pro (2nd gen)	AirPods 4	AirPods 4 with ANC	AirPods Max (USB-C)	AirPods Pro 3	AirPods Max 2	AirPods 5	AirPods 5 with Wireless Charging
Timeline	Announced		January 9, 2007	September 7, 2016	March 20, 2019	October 28, 2019	December 8, 2020	October 18, 2021	September 7, 2022	September 9, 2024			September 9, 2025	March 16, 2026	September 9, 2026	
Timeline	Released		June 29, 2007	December 13, 2016	March 20, 2019	October 30, 2019	December 15, 2020	October 26, 2021	September 23, 2022	September 20, 2024			September 19, 2025	April 1, 2026	September 18, 2026	
Timeline	Discontinued		March 23, 2009	March 20, 2019	September 9, 2024	September 7, 2022	September 9, 2024	September 9, 2024	September 9, 2025	September 9, 2026		March 16, 2026	In production			
Model	Model number	L	A1221	A1722	A2031	A2084	A2096	A2564	A2931, A2699, A2698 (Lightning); A3047, A3048, A3049 (USB-C)	A3053, A3050, A3054	A3056, A3055, A3057	A3184	A3063, A3064, A3065	A3454	A3531, A3532, A3533	A3439, A3440, A3441
Model	Model number	R	A1221	A1523	A2032	A2083	A2096	A2565	A2931, A2699, A2698 (Lightning); A3047, A3048, A3049 (USB-C)	A3053, A3050, A3054	A3056, A3055, A3057	A3184	A3063, A3064, A3065	A3454	A3531, A3532, A3533	A3439, A3440, A3441
Model	Model number	Case	A1221	A1602 (Lightning)	A1602 (Lightning); A1938 (Qi, Lightning)	A2190 (Qi, Lightning); A2190 (MagSafe, Lightning)	A2096	A2897 (Lightning); A2566 (MagSafe, Lightning)	A2700 (MagSafe, Lightning); A2968 (MagSafe, USB-C)	A3058 (USB-C)	A3059 (Qi, USB-C)	A3184	A3122	A3454	A3529 (USB-C)	A3530 (Qi, USB-C)
Model	Model identifier		[data missing]	AirPods1,1	AirPods2,1	AirPodsPro1,1; AirPods2,2 iProd8,1	AirPodsMax1,1 iProd8,6	AirPods1,3; Audio2,1	AirPodsPro1,2; AirPods3,1	AirPods1,4; AirPods3,2	AirPods1,5; AirPods3,3	AirPodsMax1,1	AirPodsPro1,3; AirPods3,4	AirPodsMax1,2; AirPods3,6	AirPods3,7	AirPods3,8
Model	Order numbers		MA817AM (with iPhone dual dock); MB536AM (without iPhone dual dock)	MMEF2AM	MV7N2AM (Lightning); MRXJ2AM (Qi)	MWP22AM	MGYJ3AM (silver); MGYH3AM (space gray); MGYL3AM (sky blue); MGYM3AM (pink); MGYN3AM (green)	MME73AM	MQD83AM (Lightning); MTJV3AM (USB-C)	MXP63LL	MXP93LL	MWW43AM (midnight); MWW53AM (starlight); MWW63AM (blue); MWW73AM (orange); MWW83AM (purple)	MFHP4LL	MHWK4AM (midnight); MHWL4AM (starlight); MHWM4AM (blue); MHWN4AM (orange); MHWP4AM (purple)	MKFW4LL	MKFT4LL
Compatibility	Bluetooth		Bluetooth 2.0	Bluetooth 4.0	Bluetooth 5.0				Bluetooth 5.3			Bluetooth 5.0	Bluetooth 5.3			
Compatibility	OS support for Siri		—N/a	iOS 10 watchOS 3 macOS Sierra	iOS 12.2 watchOS 5.2 macOS Mojave 10.14.4	iOS 13.2 watchOS 6.1 tvOS 13.2 macOS Catalina 10.15.1	iOS 14.3 iPadOS 14.3 watchOS 7.2 tvOS 14 macOS Big Sur	iOS 15.1 iPadOS 15.1 watchOS 8.1 tvOS 15.1 macOS Monterey 12.0								
System on a chip			None	Apple W1 chip	Apple H1 chip				Apple H2 chip			Apple H1 chip	Apple H2 chip			
Battery	Power	Per AirPod	[data missing]	0.093 Wh		0.16 Wh	2 × 2.53 Wh (right ear cup)	0.133 Wh	0.182 Wh	0.123 Wh		2 × 2.53 Wh (right ear cup)	0.221 Wh	2 × 2.53 Wh (right ear cup)	0.123 Wh	0.135 Wh
Battery	Power	Case	[data missing]	1.52 Wh		1.98 Wh	2 × 2.53 Wh (right ear cup)	1.327 Wh	1.997 Wh	1.329 Wh		2 × 2.53 Wh (right ear cup)	1.334 Wh	2 × 2.53 Wh (right ear cup)	1.329 Wh	
Battery	Capacity		No case	398 mAh (case)		519 mAh (case)	664 mAh (right ear cup)	345 mAh (case)	523 mAh (case); 2 × 49.7 mAh (earbuds)	345 mAh (case)		664 mAh (right ear cup)	344.53 mAh (case); 2 × 58 mAh (earbuds)	664 mAh (right ear cup)	345 mAh (case)	
Firmware	Original release		Not upgradable	3.3.1	1A661	2B576	3B71	4B52	5A374	7A295		7A291	8A354	8E246	9A350	
Firmware	Latest / final		Not upgradable	6.8.8	6F21	6F21	6F25	6F21	9B47	9B47		7E108	9B47	9B47	9B47	
Introductory US Price			$129	$159	$159	$249	$549	$179	$249	$129	$179	$549	$249	$549	$129	$149

== Criticism ==
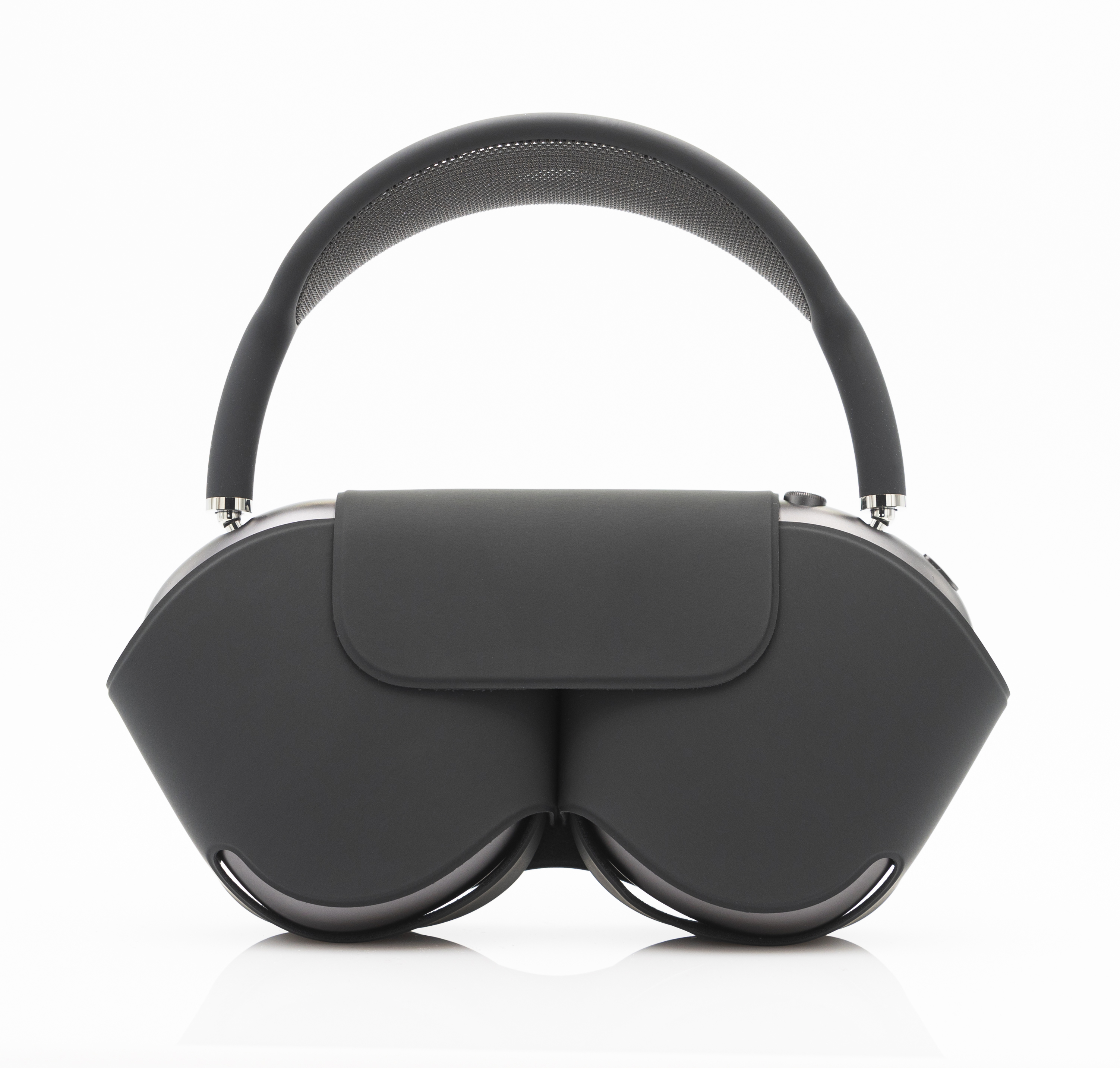
AirPods Max with Smart Case

The AirPods Max Smart Case's design has been mocked by technology reviewers, along with users on Twitter for its resemblance to that of a bra or purse. Reporter Daniel Piper of Creative Bloq states: "If we're not entirely convinced by the design of the AirPods Max themselves, we're utterly baffled by that of their charging 'Smart Case'. The shape resembles, well, lots of things, from handbags to body parts."

Numerous people have reported that condensation can build up near the drivers of the closed-back headphones after prolonged use under the removable ear cups. It has been suspected that the major cause is its full-metal body that naturally has temperature-dependent thermal conductivity.

== See also ==
- Apple headphones – Lineup of products manufactured by Apple, Inc.
  - AirPods – Wireless earbuds produced by Apple
  - AirPods Pro – Wireless earbuds produced by Apple
- Pixel Buds – Line of earbuds developed by Google
- Samsung Galaxy Buds Live – 2020 wireless earbuds by Samsung Electronics
