= AirPods =

Wireless earbuds produced by Apple

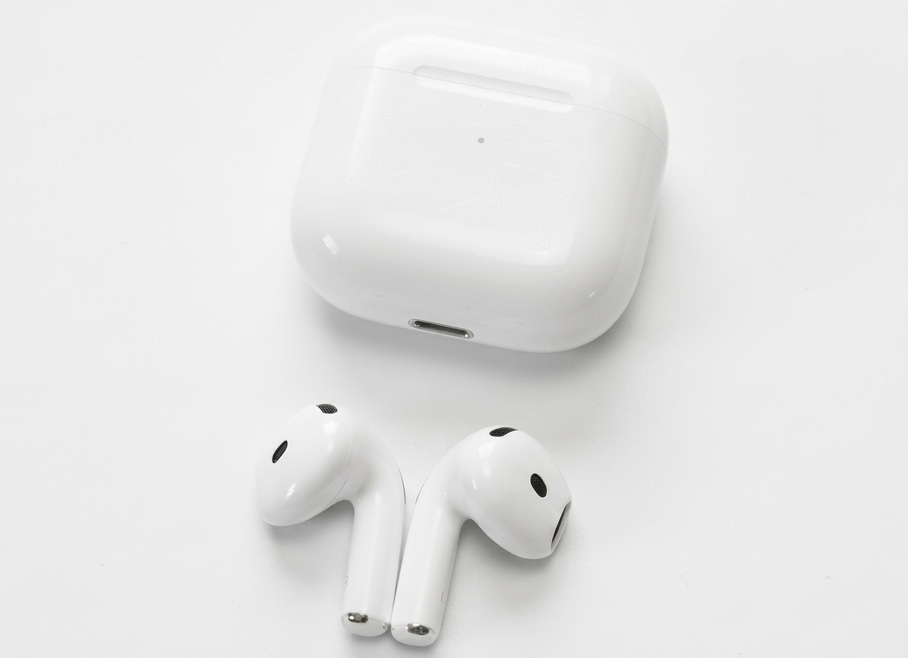
- AirPods 4 with case
- Developer: Apple
- Manufacturer: Luxshare (on contract) GoerTek (on contract)
- Product family: AirPods
- Type: Wireless earbuds
- Released: 1st gen.: December 13, 2016; 9 years ago; 2nd gen.: March 20, 2019; 7 years ago; 3rd gen.: October 26, 2021; 5 years ago; 4th gen.: September 20, 2024; 2 years ago; 5th gen.: September 18, 2026; 54 days ago
- Discontinued: 1st gen.: March 20, 2019; 2nd & 3rd gen.: September 9, 2024; 4th gen.: September 9, 2026
- System on a chip: 1st gen.: Apple W1; 2nd & 3rd gen.: Apple H1; 4th & 5th gen.: Apple H2
- Input: Dual beam-forming microphones, dual optical sensors
- Connectivity: AirPods: Bluetooth; Charging case: Lightning (1st–3rd gen.) or USB-C (4th–5th gen.); Qi (Wireless Case); MagSafe (Wireless Case, 3rd-5th gen.); Apple Watch charger (Wireless Case, 4th–5th gen.)
- Current firmware: 1st gen: 6.8.8 (December 2019); 2nd & 3rd gen: 6F21 (October 22, 2024); 4th & 5th gen: 9B47 (November 10, 2026)
- Dimensions: AirPods (each): 0.65 × 0.71 × 1.59 in (16.5 × 18.0 × 40.5 mm); Charging case: 1.74 × 0.84 × 2.11 in (44.3 × 21.3 × 53.5 mm)
- Weight: AirPods (each): 0.14 oz (4.0 g); Charging case: 1.34 oz (38 g)
- Related: AirPods Pro, AirPods Max
- Website: apple.com/airpods

AirPods are a series of wireless Bluetooth earbuds designed by Apple. They were first announced on September 7, 2016, alongside the iPhone 7, and the 2016 MacBook Pro. Within two years, they became Apple's most popular accessory. AirPods are Apple's entry-level wireless headphones, sold alongside the AirPods Pro and AirPods Max.

In addition to playing audio, the AirPods contain a microphone that filters out background noise as well as built-in accelerometers and optical sensors capable of detecting taps and pinches (e.g. double-tap or pinch to pause audio) and placement within the ear, which enables automatic pausing of audio when they are taken out of the ear.

On March 20, 2019, Apple released the second-generation AirPods, which feature the H1 chip, longer talk time, and hands-free "Hey Siri" support. A higher-end version includes a charging case that supports Qi charging.

On October 26, 2021, Apple released the third-generation AirPods, which feature an external redesign with shorter stems similar to AirPods Pro, spatial audio, IPX4 water resistance, longer battery life, and MagSafe charging capability.

On September 9, 2024, Apple announced the AirPods 4, which feature the H2 chip, Bluetooth 5.3, and a USB-C charging case. The higher end model features active noise cancellation and a charging case that supports Qi and Apple Watch chargers. Additionally, after iOS 26, the higher-end model supports real-time foreign language conversation through AI translation.

On September 9, 2026, Apple announced the AirPods 5 with enhanced noise cancellation, which is available on both models. The higher-end model adds wireless charging and on-stem volume adjustment.

== Models ==
=== 1st generation ===
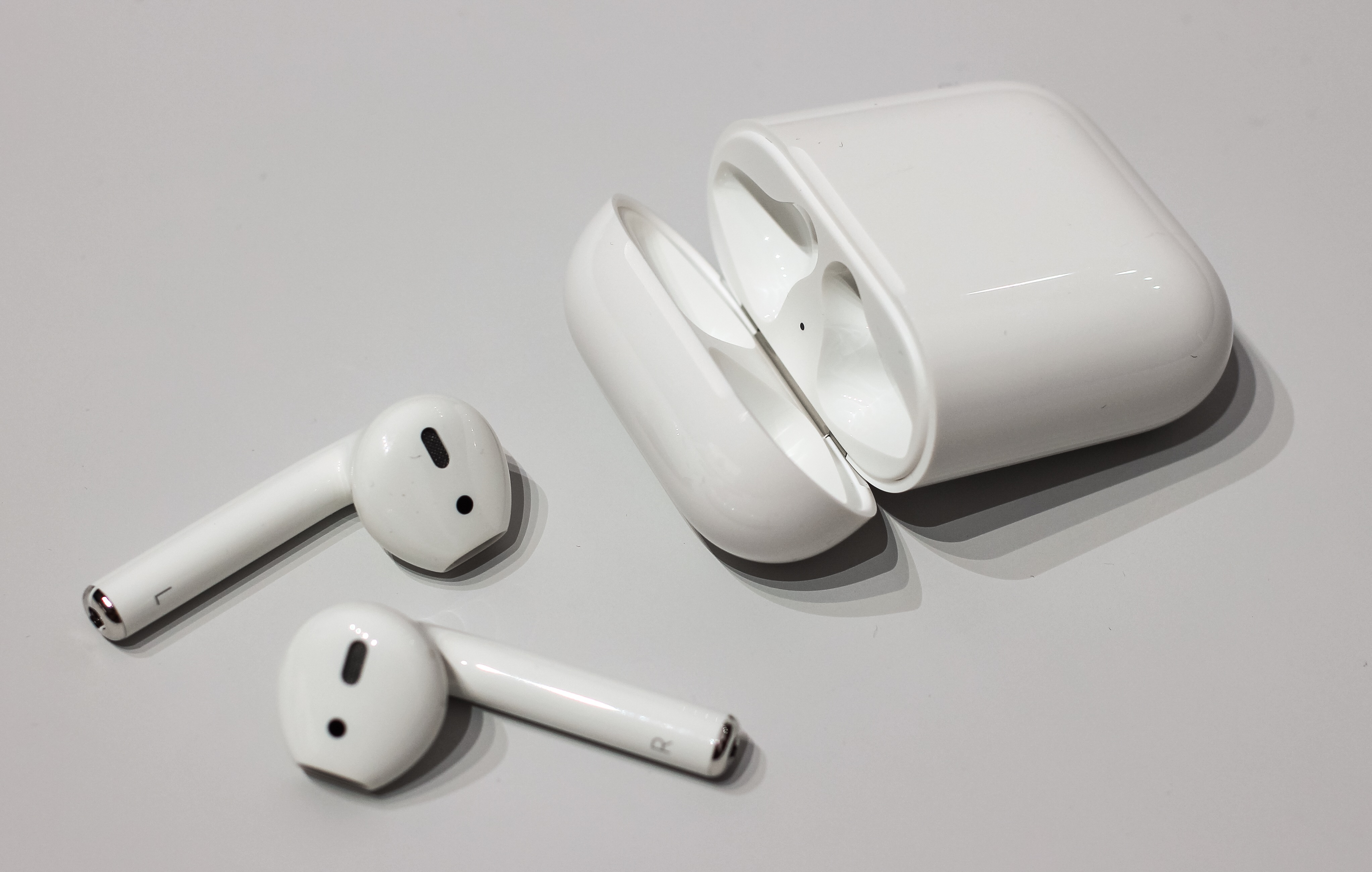
First-generation AirPods

Apple announced the first generation of AirPods on September 7, 2016, at an Apple Special Event alongside the iPhone 7 and Apple Watch Series 2. Apple originally planned to release the AirPods in late October, but delayed the release date. On December 13, 2016, Apple began taking online orders for AirPods. They were available at Apple Stores, Apple Authorized Resellers, and select carriers on December 20, 2016.

AirPods contain a proprietary Apple W1 SoC processor which helps optimize battery use as well as the Bluetooth 4.2 and audio connections. The advanced connectivity functions of the W1 requires devices running iOS 10, macOS Sierra, watchOS 3, or later. They can also function as standard Bluetooth headphones when connected to any device that supports Bluetooth 4.0 or higher, including Windows laptops and Android devices.

There are two microphones inside each AirPod, one facing outward at ear level and another at the bottom of the stem. Each AirPod weighs 0.14 oz (4 g), and its charging case weighs 1.34 oz (38 g). The AirPods are capable of holding a charge of around five hours. Charging them for fifteen minutes in the case gives three hours of listening time. The charging case provides 24 hours of total usage time. During a complete dismantling, each AirPod was found to contain a 93 milliwatt hour battery in its stem, while the charging case contains a 1.52 watt hour or 398 mAh at 3.81 V battery.

The model numbers for the first-generation AirPods are A1523 and A1722.

Production of the first-generation AirPods was discontinued on March 20, 2019, after the second generation was released.

=== 2nd generation ===
Apple announced the second-generation AirPods on March 20, 2019. They use the same design as the first generation. They include an H1 processor which supports hands-free "Hey Siri" and Bluetooth 5 connectivity. Apple also claims 50% more talk time and faster device connection times. The "Announce Messages with Siri" feature was added in iOS 13.2, which allows the user to dictate text messages to Siri.

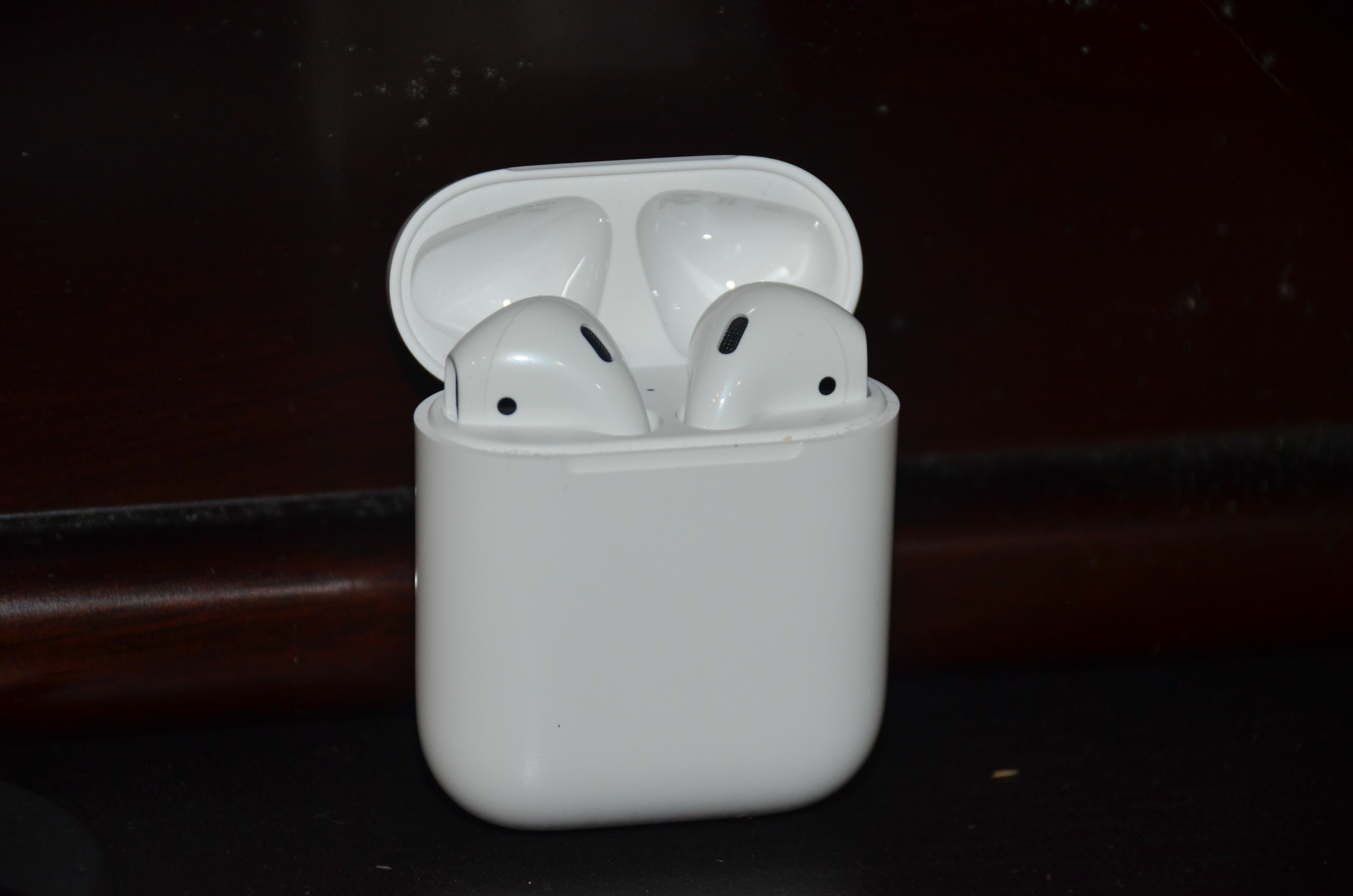
Second-generation AirPods in their charging case

Second-generation AirPods can be purchased with the same charging case as the first generation, or in a higher-end configuration that comes bundled with the Wireless Charging Case, which can be used with Qi chargers. The Wireless Charging Case can be purchased separately and is compatible with first-generation AirPods. It moves the charging indicator LED to the exterior of the case. The Wireless Charging Case was initially announced in September 2017 alongside the AirPower charging mat, but was delayed by AirPower's protracted development and eventual cancellation. The second generation AirPods remained on sale with a price cut following the release of the third generation in October 2021, but were only available with the Lightning charging case.

The model numbers for the second-generation AirPods are A2031 and A2032.

=== 3rd generation ===
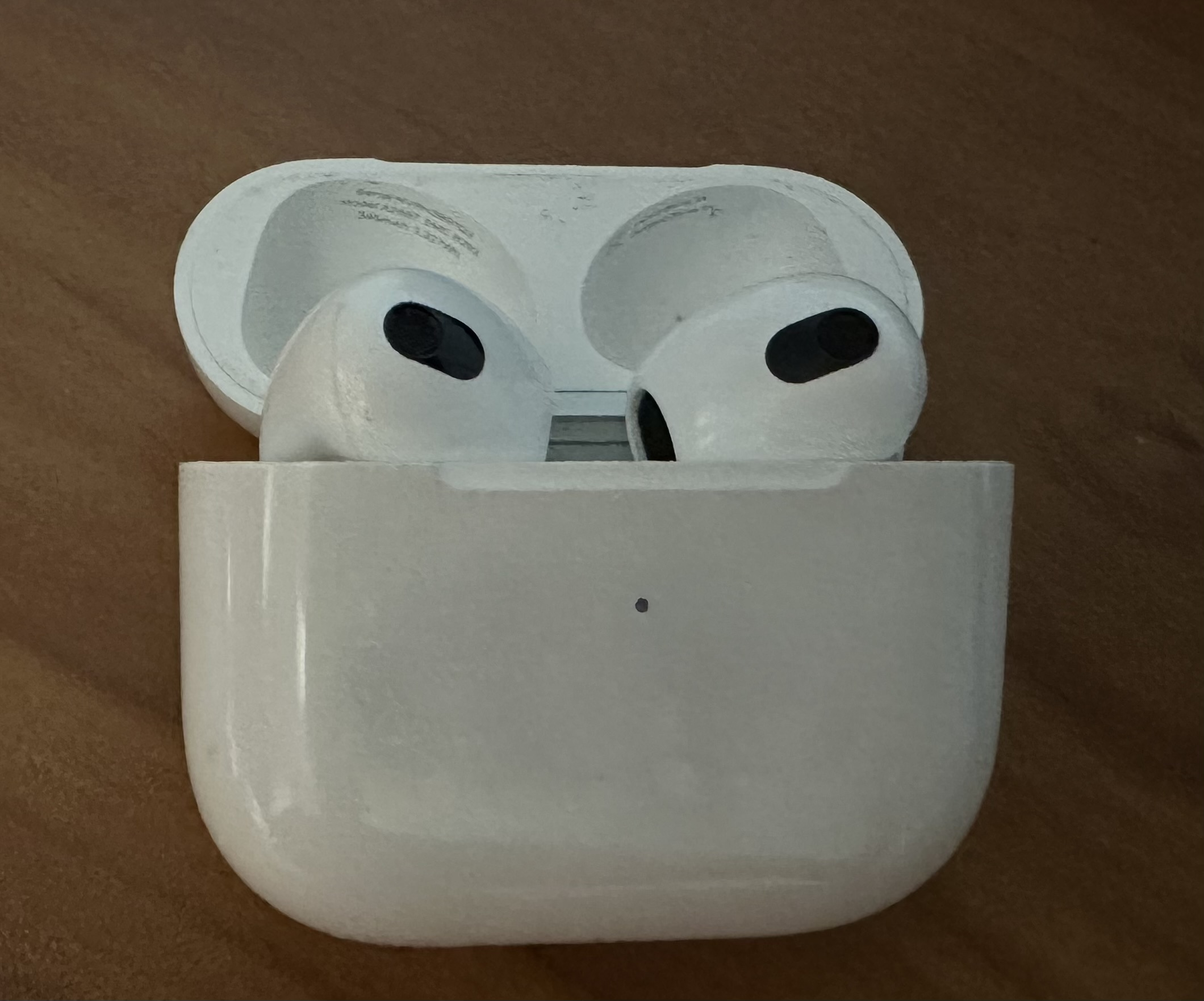
Third-generation AirPods in their charging case

Apple announced the third generation AirPods on October 18, 2021. They feature an external redesign with shorter stems, similar to AirPods Pro, and use similar force-touch controls. They include support for spatial audio and Dolby Atmos, IPX4 water resistance, ear detection and a case supporting MagSafe charging. Apple claims increased battery life, with AirPods lasting six hours and the charging case providing up to 30 hours. Preorders of the third-generation AirPods began on October 18, 2021. The third-generation AirPods were released on October 26, 2021, and were priced at $179. In September 2022, Apple released a $169 variant with a charging case lacking Qi and MagSafe charging compatibility.

The model numbers for the third-generation AirPods are A2565 and A2564.

=== 4th generation ===
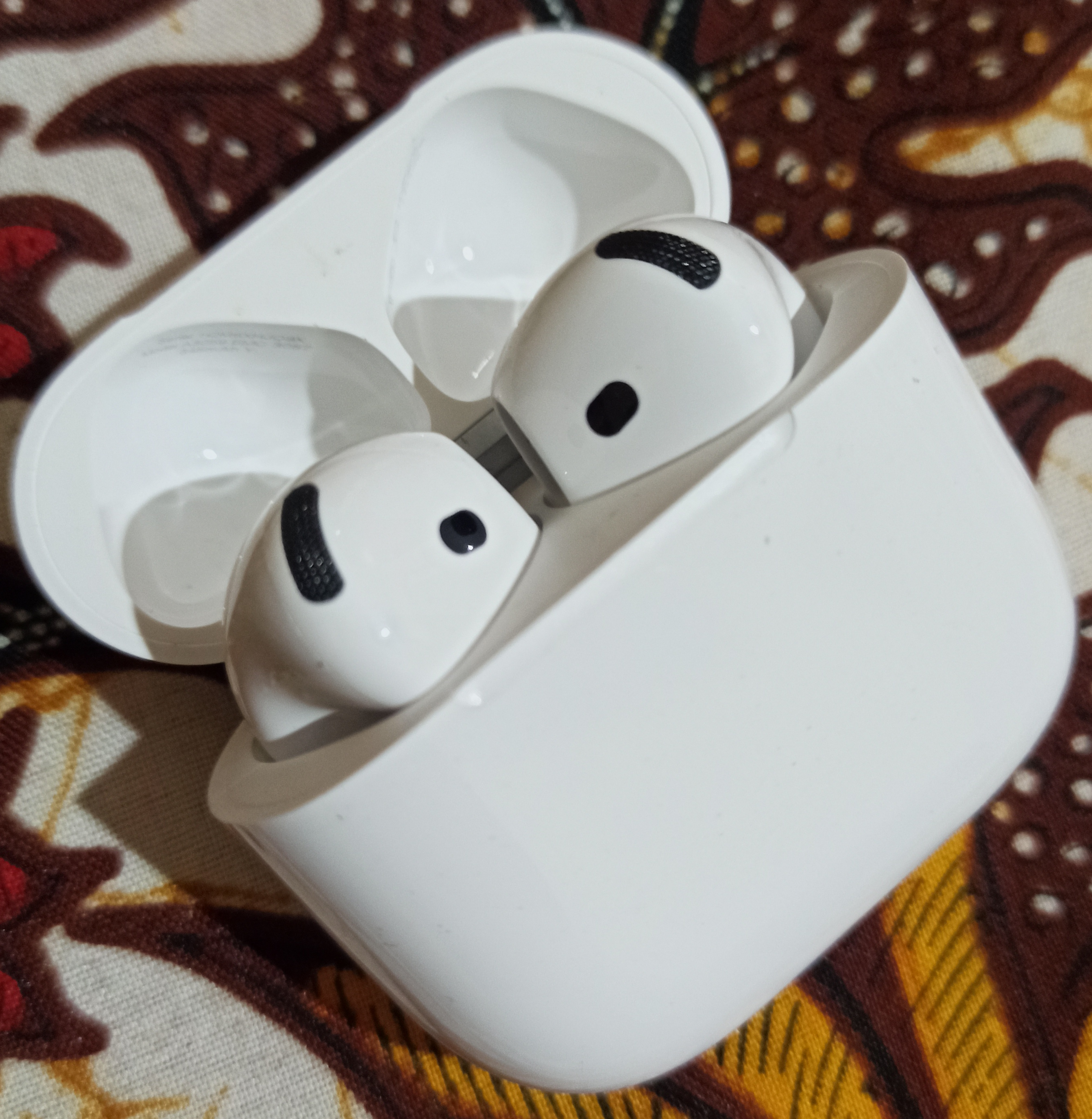
AirPods 4 in their charging case

Apple announced the AirPods 4 on September 9, 2024. They feature redesigned earbud control and speakers, the H2 chip, Bluetooth 5.3, IP54 dust and water resistance, and a smaller charging case with USB-C charging. A higher-end version features active noise cancellation and a charging case with a speaker for Find My tracking and compatibility with Qi and Apple Watch chargers. The charging case no longer has magnets to mount on MagSafe chargers due to its smaller size. iOS 26 added Live Translation with the active noise cancellation version when used with an iPhone that supports Apple Intelligence (Apple A17 Pro chip or newer).

The model numbers for the fourth-generation AirPods are A3053, A3050, A3054, A3056, A3055 and A3057.

=== 5th generation ===
AirPods 5 in their charging case

Apple announced the AirPods 5 on September 9, 2026. They feature improved active noise cancellation and voice isolation, and IP57 dust and water resistance. A higher-end version features a charging case with a speaker for Find My tracking, compatibility with Qi and Apple Watch chargers, volume adjusting gestures to the AirPods' stems and a longer battery life.

The model numbers for the fifth-generation AirPods are A3531, A3532, A3533 A3439, A3440 and A3441.

== Technical specifications ==
=== Compatibility ===
AirPods are compatible with any device that supports Bluetooth 4.0 or higher, including Android and Windows devices, although certain features such as automatic switching between devices are only available on Apple devices using iCloud.

The first-generation AirPods are fully compatible with iPhone, iPad, and iPod touch models with iOS 10 or later, Apple Watch models with watchOS 3 or later, and Mac models with macOS Sierra or later.

The second-generation AirPods are fully compatible with devices running iOS 12.2 or later, macOS Mojave 10.14.4 or later, and watchOS 5.2 or later.

The third-generation AirPods are fully compatible with devices running iOS 15.1 or later, iPadOS 15.1 or later, macOS Monterey 12.0 or later, and watchOS 8.1 or later.

The AirPods 4 are fully compatible with devices running iOS 18 or later, iPadOS 18 or later, macOS Sequoia 15.0 or later, and watchOS 11 and later.

=== Support ===
The lithium-ion batteries in AirPods can see significant degradation over time, with two-year-old sets lasting for less than half of the advertised five hours. Apple has a program to service batteries and purchase replacement individual AirPods and charging cases. The replacement of one or both AirPods or the charging case has a lower price with AppleCare+ than without. Apple offers battery servicing for free with AppleCare+ and for a fee without. However, this is just a replacement service, as AirPods cannot be repaired without destroying their outer case, resulting in iFixit giving Airpods 1, 2, and 4 a 0/10 repairability score.

AirPods contain upgradeable firmware. Its original firmware was version 3.3.1. In February 2017, Apple released version 3.5.1, 3.7.2 in May 2017, and then 6.3.2 on March 26, 2019. In July 2019, version 6.7.8 was released and 6.8.8 followed in September 2019. In June 2020, firmware 2D15 was released (G2). In September 2020, firmware 3A283 (G2 and Pro) was released and in April 2021, firmware 3E751. AirPods automatically sync through Apple's iCloud service, allowing users to switch audio sources to other supported devices connected by the same Apple Account.

Legend	Discontinued and unsupported	Discontinued but supported	Current	Upcoming

Comparative technical specifications of all AirPods models
Model			iPhone Bluetooth Headset	AirPods (1st gen)	AirPods (2nd gen)	AirPods Pro (1st gen)	AirPods Max (Lightning)	AirPods (3rd gen)	AirPods Pro (2nd gen)	AirPods 4	AirPods 4 with ANC	AirPods Max (USB-C)	AirPods Pro 3	AirPods Max 2	AirPods 5	AirPods 5 with Wireless Charging
Timeline	Announced		January 9, 2007	September 7, 2016	March 20, 2019	October 28, 2019	December 8, 2020	October 18, 2021	September 7, 2022	September 9, 2024			September 9, 2025	March 16, 2026	September 9, 2026	
Timeline	Released		June 29, 2007	December 13, 2016	March 20, 2019	October 30, 2019	December 15, 2020	October 26, 2021	September 23, 2022	September 20, 2024			September 19, 2025	April 1, 2026	September 18, 2026	
Timeline	Discontinued		March 23, 2009	March 20, 2019	September 9, 2024	September 7, 2022	September 9, 2024	September 9, 2024	September 9, 2025	September 9, 2026		March 16, 2026	In production			
Model	Model number	L	A1221	A1722	A2031	A2084	A2096	A2564	A2931, A2699, A2698 (Lightning); A3047, A3048, A3049 (USB-C)	A3053, A3050, A3054	A3056, A3055, A3057	A3184	A3063, A3064, A3065	A3454	A3531, A3532, A3533	A3439, A3440, A3441
Model	Model number	R	A1221	A1523	A2032	A2083	A2096	A2565	A2931, A2699, A2698 (Lightning); A3047, A3048, A3049 (USB-C)	A3053, A3050, A3054	A3056, A3055, A3057	A3184	A3063, A3064, A3065	A3454	A3531, A3532, A3533	A3439, A3440, A3441
Model	Model number	Case	A1221	A1602 (Lightning)	A1602 (Lightning); A1938 (Qi, Lightning)	A2190 (Qi, Lightning); A2190 (MagSafe, Lightning)	A2096	A2897 (Lightning); A2566 (MagSafe, Lightning)	A2700 (MagSafe, Lightning); A2968 (MagSafe, USB-C)	A3058 (USB-C)	A3059 (Qi, USB-C)	A3184	A3122	A3454	A3529 (USB-C)	A3530 (Qi, USB-C)
Model	Model identifier		[data missing]	AirPods1,1	AirPods2,1	AirPodsPro1,1; AirPods2,2 iProd8,1	AirPodsMax1,1 iProd8,6	AirPods1,3; Audio2,1	AirPodsPro1,2; AirPods3,1	AirPods1,4; AirPods3,2	AirPods1,5; AirPods3,3	AirPodsMax1,1	AirPodsPro1,3; AirPods3,4	AirPodsMax1,2; AirPods3,6	AirPods3,7	AirPods3,8
Model	Order numbers		MA817AM (with iPhone dual dock); MB536AM (without iPhone dual dock)	MMEF2AM	MV7N2AM (Lightning); MRXJ2AM (Qi)	MWP22AM	MGYJ3AM (silver); MGYH3AM (space gray); MGYL3AM (sky blue); MGYM3AM (pink); MGYN3AM (green)	MME73AM	MQD83AM (Lightning); MTJV3AM (USB-C)	MXP63LL	MXP93LL	MWW43AM (midnight); MWW53AM (starlight); MWW63AM (blue); MWW73AM (orange); MWW83AM (purple)	MFHP4LL	MHWK4AM (midnight); MHWL4AM (starlight); MHWM4AM (blue); MHWN4AM (orange); MHWP4AM (purple)	MKFW4LL	MKFT4LL
Compatibility	Bluetooth		Bluetooth 2.0	Bluetooth 4.0	Bluetooth 5.0				Bluetooth 5.3			Bluetooth 5.0	Bluetooth 5.3			
Compatibility	OS support for Siri		—N/a	iOS 10 watchOS 3 macOS Sierra	iOS 12.2 watchOS 5.2 macOS Mojave 10.14.4	iOS 13.2 watchOS 6.1 tvOS 13.2 macOS Catalina 10.15.1	iOS 14.3 iPadOS 14.3 watchOS 7.2 tvOS 14 macOS Big Sur	iOS 15.1 iPadOS 15.1 watchOS 8.1 tvOS 15.1 macOS Monterey 12.0								
System on a chip			None	Apple W1 chip	Apple H1 chip				Apple H2 chip			Apple H1 chip	Apple H2 chip			
Battery	Power	Per AirPod	[data missing]	0.093 Wh		0.16 Wh	2 × 2.53 Wh (right ear cup)	0.133 Wh	0.182 Wh	0.123 Wh		2 × 2.53 Wh (right ear cup)	0.221 Wh	2 × 2.53 Wh (right ear cup)	0.123 Wh	0.135 Wh
Battery	Power	Case	[data missing]	1.52 Wh		1.98 Wh	2 × 2.53 Wh (right ear cup)	1.327 Wh	1.997 Wh	1.329 Wh		2 × 2.53 Wh (right ear cup)	1.334 Wh	2 × 2.53 Wh (right ear cup)	1.329 Wh	
Battery	Capacity		No case	398 mAh (case)		519 mAh (case)	664 mAh (right ear cup)	345 mAh (case)	523 mAh (case); 2 × 49.7 mAh (earbuds)	345 mAh (case)		664 mAh (right ear cup)	344.53 mAh (case); 2 × 58 mAh (earbuds)	664 mAh (right ear cup)	345 mAh (case)	
Firmware	Original release		Not upgradable	3.3.1	1A661	2B576	3B71	4B52	5A374	7A295		7A291	8A354	8E246	9A350	
Firmware	Latest / final		Not upgradable	6.8.8	6F21	6F21	6F25	6F21	9B47	9B47		7E108	9B47	9B47	9B47	
Introductory US Price			$129	$159	$159	$249	$549	$179	$249	$129	$179	$549	$249	$549	$129	$149

== Sales ==
Analysts estimate Apple sold between 14 million and 16 million AirPods in 2017. In 2018, AirPods were Apple's most popular accessory product, with 35 million units sold. 60 million units were sold in 2019. Analysts estimate AirPods make up 60% of the global wireless headphone market and that Apple's entire Wearables products (Apple Watch, AirPods, and AirPods Pro) "is now bigger than 60% of the companies in the Fortune 500". An estimated 5-7% of Apple's revenue from AirPods comes from replacement earbuds and cases. Analysts estimate Apple sold approximately 120 million pairs in 2021.

== Cultural impact ==
On announcement day, AirPods were compared to Apple's previously existing EarPods (2012–present), with The Verge noting "They look... just like the old EarPods, with the wires cut off." Initially mocked by many for their unfamiliar design (including CNN asking "Would people actually wear these?" in 2016), their popularity grew rapidly over the years and they were voted the most popular "hearable" brand of 2019.

At an Apple earnings call in 2019, CEO Tim Cook called AirPods "nothing less than a cultural phenomenon". AirPods had become a viral sensation with memes circulating across the internet about their appearance and relation to the removal of the headphone jack in iPhones. However, as time wore on, AirPods became known as a status symbol.

=== Criticism ===
AirPods were seen and heavily marketed as a replacement for wired earbuds, as they were announced the same time as the iPhone 7, the first iPhone to remove the headphone jack. Many people saw it as manufactured demand and criticized it.

AirPods have been criticized for their high price; however, at launch they were actually priced less than most "true wireless" earbuds on the market (e.g. the Samsung Gear IconX and Bragi Dash) and remain competitively priced with similar products from other major brands.

Since AirPods can easily be worn for long periods of time, AirPods have also had an effect on how people interact with each other. Having earphones in is generally perceived as a "do not disturb" signal, and some AirPods users use this fact to strategically avoid awkward small talk. But in the collaborative workplace, constant use of AirPods has sometimes been interpreted as a sign of disrespect to co-workers, causing conflict in the office. Students and college professors from George Washington University have commented that AirPods have decreased students' daily social interactions.

Another prominent criticism was a problem that caused the charging case battery to deplete at a rapid rate despite the AirPods not being used. Users were reporting upwards of 30% idle discharge per day. In response, Apple released a firmware update (version 3.5.1) for the AirPods, which addressed connectivity and battery drain problems.

According to the Financial Times, AirPods are difficult, if not impossible, to recycle, and not designed to be repairable.

=== Replacement for hearing aids ===
In 2022, researchers at the Taipei Veterans General Hospital in Taiwan compared the performance of second-generation AirPods and first-generation AirPods Pro using Live Listen on an iPhone or iPad to compare to medical hearing aids. Oticon Opn 1 was the high-end comparison, with Bernafon MD1 as the more affordable alternative. The performance of the systems was at least assisting participants with Pro (including noise canceling features) being better and approximating the hearing aids.

== Competition ==
Some consumers expressed the viewpoint that there were better options for wireless earphones based on quality and cost. One of Apple's biggest competitors is Samsung, which markets wireless earbuds that are very similar to AirPods. Another similar product line is from Apple's Beats Electronics, which sells products such as the Powerbeats Pro wireless earbuds.

== See also ==
- Apple headphones
  - EarPods
  - AirPods Pro
  - AirPods Max
- Gear IconX and Galaxy Buds
- Pixel Buds
- Hearables
- Powerbeats Pro
