= Lightning (connector) =

Proprietary computer bus and power connector by Apple Inc.

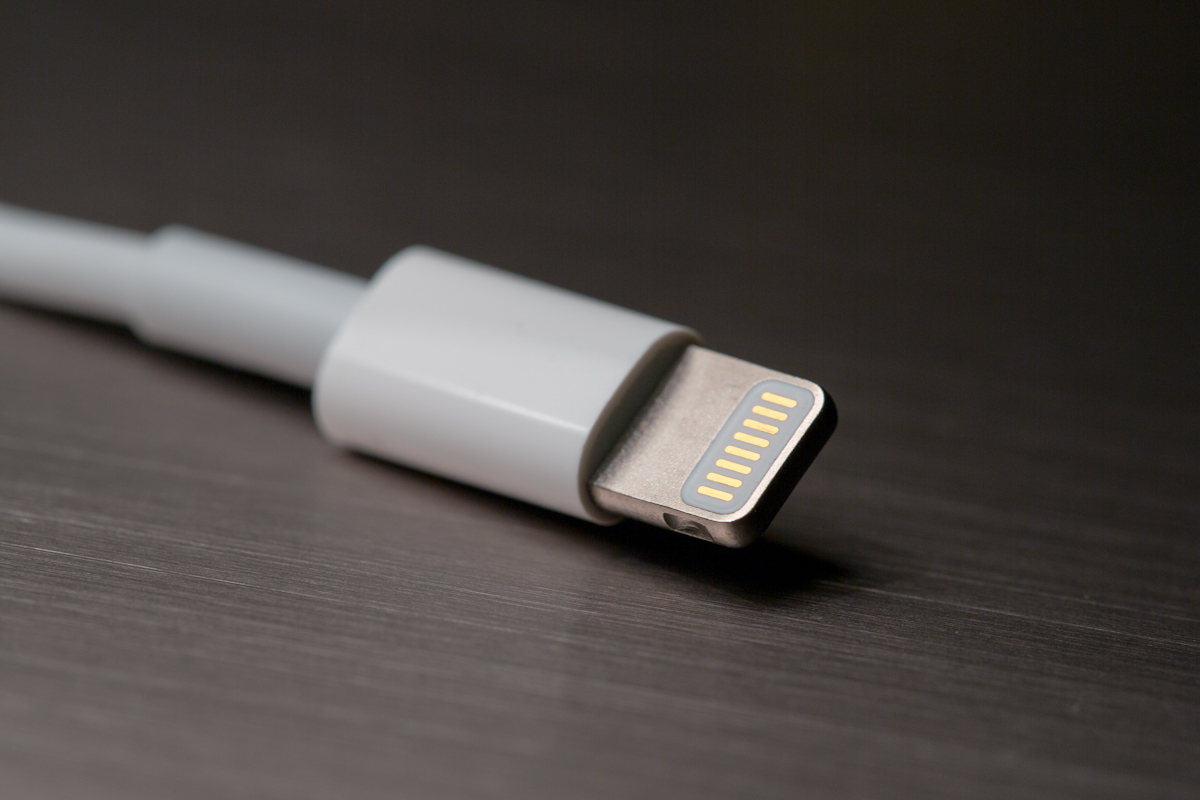
- Top-down view of a Lightning connector, showing one side of eight pins
- Type: Data and power connector

Production history
- Designer: Apple Inc.
- Designed: 2012
- Produced: 2012–2025
- Superseded: 30-pin dock connector
- Superseded by: USB-C

General specifications
- Pins: 8

Pinout
- Pins of the Lightning connector
Pin 1	GND	Ground
Pin 2	L0p	Lane 0 positive
Pin 3	L0n	Lane 0 negative
Pin 4	ID0	Identification / control 0
Pin 5	PWR	Power (charger or battery)
Pin 6	L1n	Lane 1 negative
Pin 7	L1p	Lane 1 positive
Pin 8	ID1	Identification / control 1
- Lane 0 and 1 may be swapped in the IC of the device connector. No swapping occurs if the accessory identification chip is connected to the ID0 pin.

Lightning is a discontinued proprietary computer bus and power connector, created and designed by Apple Inc. It was introduced on September 12, 2012, in conjunction with the iPhone 5, to replace its predecessor, the 30-pin dock connector, and discontinued in 2025, with the discontinuation of the iPhone SE (3rd generation).

The Lightning connector is used to connect legacy Apple mobile devices like iPhones, iPads, and iPods to host computers, external monitors, cameras, USB battery chargers, and other peripherals. Using 8 pins instead of 30, Lightning is much smaller than its predecessor. The Lightning connector is reversible. The plug is indented on each side to match up with corresponding points inside the receptacle to retain the connection.

Countries with mandatory application of USB-C power ports – for most 5-20 V (max 100 W) consumer devices – by law

In 2018, Apple began transitioning to USB-C on iPad Pros and accessories. In response to European Union legislation to standardize charging ports passed in 2022, Apple said it would comply with regulations. The iPhone 15 and 15 Plus and the iPhone 15 Pro and Pro Max, announced on September 12, 2023, became the first iPhones to use USB-C, and the last few Lightning accessories made the transition in 2024 and 2025.

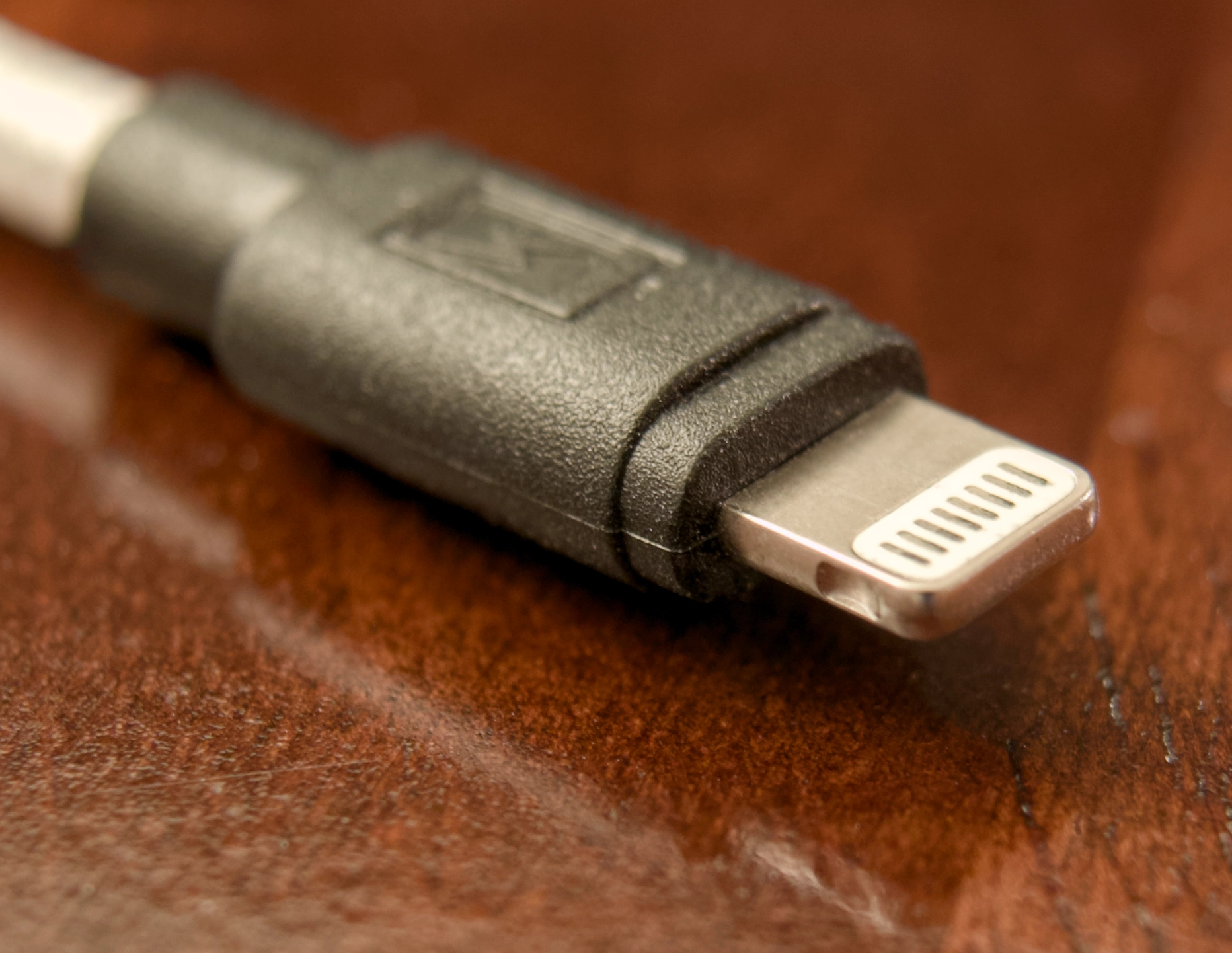
Apple Lightning Connector

== History ==
The Lightning connector was introduced on September 12, 2012, with the iPhone 5, as a replacement for the 30-pin dock connector. The iPod Touch (5th generation), iPod Nano (7th generation), iPad (4th generation) and iPad Mini (1st generation) followed in October and November 2012 as the first devices with Lightning.

On November 25, 2012, Apple acquired the "Lightning" trademark in Europe from Harley-Davidson. Apple was given a partial transfer of the Lightning trademark, suggesting that Harley-Davidson likely retained the rights to use the name for motorcycle-related products.

The first-generation iPad Pro (12.9-inch models only) and the second-generation iPad Pro were the only devices in which the Lightning connector supported USB 3.0 host. The only accessory released with USB 3.0 support was the Lightning to USB 3 Camera Adapter.

=== Transition to USB-C ===
In October 2018, following the implementation of USB-C across the Mac lineup, Apple released a range of iPad Pro models that replaced Lightning with it; the 2020 iPad Air (4th generation), 2021 iPad Mini (6th generation), and 2022 iPad (10th generation) similarly replaced Lightning with USB-C. In October 2022, Apple released the Siri Remote for the 3rd generation Apple TV 4K with a USB-C connector, becoming Apple's first accessory to charge via USB-C.

In January 2020, the European Commission proposed laws to standardize charger ports. On October 4, 2022, the European Parliament approved regulations that require all electronic devices to support USB-C, in order to meet pressure by EU consumers regarding financial costs and electronic waste. Commentators said that these regulations would impact Apple most heavily. Apple stated concerns that this will "harm consumers in Europe and around the world", but on October 25, 2022, Greg Joswiak, vice president of global marketing for Apple, said that Apple would comply with the new EU regulations, indirectly confirming that iPhone models and other devices, if not portless, would ultimately replace Lightning with USB-C in the future.

Released on September 22, 2023, the iPhone 15 series were the first iPhone models to use USB-C. This meant all iPad models released from March 18, 2022 and iPhone models released from September 22, 2023 use USB-C. The 2nd generation AirPods Pro were updated to a USB-C charging case, and the MagSafe Duo Charger and MagSafe Battery Pack, which used the Lightning connector, were discontinued.

Apple subsequently transitioned its AirPods (on 9 September 2024) and Magic Mouse, Magic Trackpad and Magic Keyboard (all on October 28, 2024) to USB-C. Apple's last accessory using Lightning were the AirPods Max, which were revised in September 2024 to use USB-C.

On February 19, 2025, following the discontinuation of the iPhone 14, iPhone 14 Plus, and iPhone SE (3rd generation), all iPhone models sold use USB-C.

== Technology ==
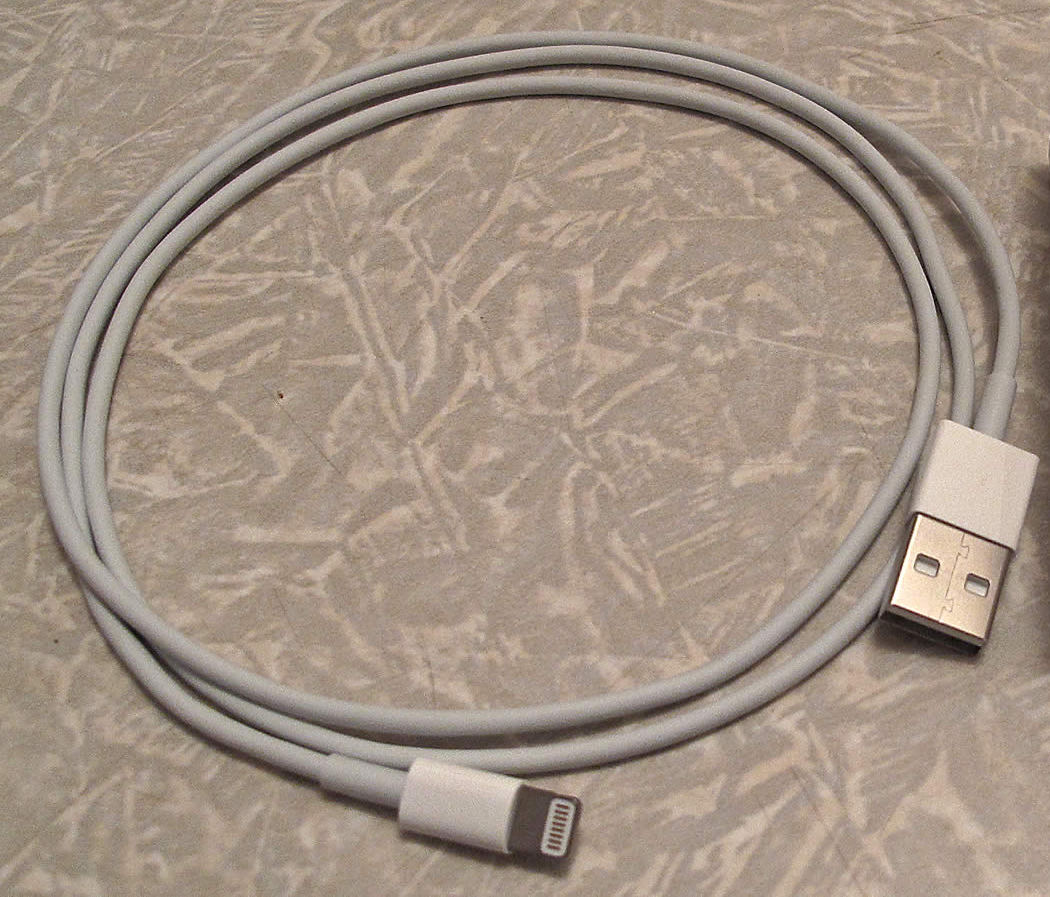
Apple Lightning to USB-A cable

Lightning is an eight-pin digital connector. Unlike the 30-pin dock connector it replaced (and USB Type-A and Type-B connectors), it is reversible.

Most Lightning devices only support USB 2.0, which has a maximum transfer speed of 480 Mb/s, or 60 Mb/s. With USB 2.0, only one lane is in use at a time. Only the 12.9-inch iPad Pro (1st and 2nd generation) and 10.5-inch iPad Pro support USB 5Gbps (USB 3.2 Gen 1 operation mode), which has a maximum transfer speed of 5 Gb/s, or 625 Mb/s. This requires the Lightning to USB 3 Camera Adapter, which allows the iPad to connect with cameras and storage peripherals, but not computers.

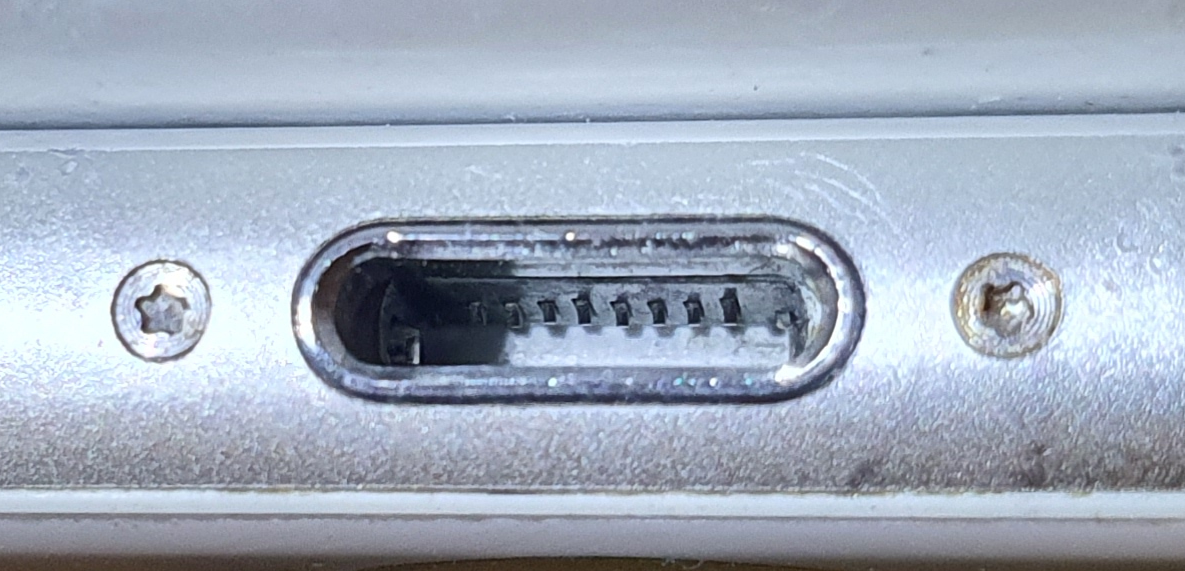
Lightning connector

Apple offers various adapters that allow the Lightning connector to be used with other interfaces, such as 30-pin, USB-C, HDMI, VGA, and SD cards. The Lightning to 30-pin adapter supports only a limited subset of the available 30-pin signals: USB data, USB charging, and analog audio output (via the DAC inside of the adapter).

Lightning connectors contain an authentication chip that makes it difficult for third-party manufacturers to produce compatible accessories without being approved by Apple. The authentication scheme has been cracked by some third parties.

The connector is 6.7 mm by 1.5 mm.

Lightning 8-pin and 16-pin receptacles

== Versions ==
- C48 – gold plated connector pins, produced before March 2019, used in USB-A to Lightning cable
- C89 – rhodium-ruthenium plated (silver coloured) connector pins, more durable than C48 due to big IC, used in USB-A to Lightning cable
- C91 – 18W USB PD, used in Apple USB-C to Lightning cable, Apple later switched to using C94, same appearance and cost as C94
- C94 – 18W USB PD, used in third party MFi USB-C to Lightning cable, same appearance and cost as C91
- C100 – used in Earpods with Lightning Connector, same appearance as C101, lower price than C101
- C101 – used in Lightning to 3.5 mm headphone jack adapter, same appearance as C100, higher price than C100

== Compatible devices ==
=== iPhone ===
- iPhone 5
- iPhone 5C
- iPhone 5S
- iPhone 6/6 Plus
- iPhone 6S/6S Plus
- iPhone SE (1st generation)
- iPhone 7/7 Plus
- iPhone 8/8 Plus
- iPhone X
- iPhone XS/XS Max
- iPhone XR
- iPhone 11
- iPhone 11 Pro/11 Pro Max
- iPhone SE (2nd generation)
- iPhone 12/12 mini
- iPhone 13/13 mini
- iPhone 13 Pro/13 Pro Max
- iPhone SE (3rd generation)
- iPhone 14/14 Plus
- iPhone 12 Pro/12 Pro Max
- iPhone 13 Pro/13 Pro Max
- iPhone 14 Pro/14 Pro Max

=== iPad ===
- iPad (4th generation)
- iPad (5th generation)
- iPad (6th generation)
- iPad (7th generation)
- iPad (8th generation)
- iPad (9th generation)
- iPad Mini (1st generation)
- iPad Mini 2
- iPad Mini 3
- iPad Mini 4
- iPad Mini (5th generation)
- iPad Air (1st generation)
- iPad Air 2
- iPad Air (3rd generation)
- iPad Pro (1st generation)
- iPad Pro (2nd generation)

=== iPod ===
- iPod Nano (7th generation)
- iPod Touch (5th generation)
- iPod Touch (6th generation)
- iPod Touch (7th generation)

=== Accessories ===
- Siri Remote (first and second generations)
- Beats Solo Pro headphones
- BeatsX earphones
- Powerbeats Pro
- Beats Pill+ speaker
- AirPods (1st generation) Charging Case and Wireless Charging Case
- AirPods (2nd generation) Lightning Charging Case
- AirPods (3rd generation) Lightning Charging Case/MagSafe Charging Case
- AirPods Pro (1st generation) Wireless Charging Case
- AirPods Pro (2nd generation) MagSafe Charging Case
- AirPods Max (Lightning)
- Apple Pencil (1st generation)
- Apple Watch Magnetic Charging Dock
- MagSafe Duo Charger
- MagSafe Battery Pack
- Magic Keyboard 2
- Magic Keyboard with Numeric Keypad
- Magic Mouse 2
- Magic Trackpad 2
- EarPods (Lightning Connector)

== Reception ==
Initial opinions of the Lightning connector in media were mixed: publications appreciated the reversibility and increased durability of the connector but were critical of its proprietary nature, of the effects of its authentication protocol on third-party accessory availability, and of the lack of performance improvements over the 30-pin dock connector.

Reviewers criticised Apple for continuing to include a Lightning port on its iPhones despite the widespread adoption of USB-C, especially as Apple had already pioneered adoption of USB-C as the primary connector for both data and power on the iPad Pro and MacBook lineups.

Apple claimed that it continued to use Lightning because replacing it would supposedly produce "an unprecedented amount of electronic waste". Some reviewers, like Business Insider senior tech correspondent Lisa Eadicicco, posited that it was simply because Apple wanted to continue profiting from its proprietary chargers and accessories.

=== MFi certification ===
Apple introduced the MFi Program, referring to "Made for iPhone/iPod/iPad", to increase the quality of third-party accessories and consumer confidence.

=== Black contacts ===
A known failure mode of Lightning plugs is power contacts turning black over time, sometimes causing the affected side of the connector to cease functioning. When the plug is inserted or unplugged while powered, a brief spark may occur between the mating power contacts in the plug and socket, eroding their gold plating. Because the Lightning plug's contacts are unprotected, if touched by a user's fingers, the accessible surface can easily become contaminated by conductive substances, such as sweat and salts. Ionic contaminants then allow the base metal of the contact, exposed by the damaged plating, to undergo electrolytic corrosion. The remaining gold plating wears off mechanically and through further sparking, progressively exposing the corroded base metal, which appears black. A good practice is to never touch a gold-plated connector with the fingers.

In 2019, Apple released new versions of the Lightning connector and ceased production of the older versions. These new versions included many improvements, including a more robust, silver-colored ruthenium–rhodium contact plating instead of gold.
