= AirPods Pro =

Wireless earbuds produced by Apple

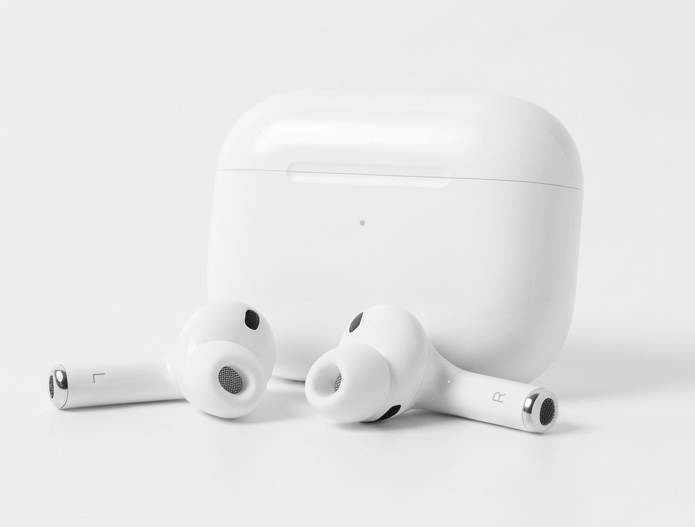
- Third-generation AirPods Pro with charging case
- Developer: Apple Inc.
- Manufacturer: Luxshare (under contract)
- Product family: AirPods
- Type: Wireless in-ear headphones
- Released: 1st generation: October 30, 2019; 6 years ago; 2nd generation (Lightning): September 23, 2022; 3 years ago; 2nd generation (USB-C): September 22, 2023; 2 years ago; AirPods Pro 3: September 19, 2025; 10 months ago
- Introductory price: US$249.00
- Discontinued: 1st gen: September 7, 2022; 2nd gen: September 9, 2025
- System on a chip: 1st gen: Apple H1; 2nd gen: Apple H2 (AirPods), Apple U1 (charging case); 3rd gen: Apple H2 (AirPods), Apple U2 (charging case)
- Input: Both: Dual beamforming microphones, inward-facing microphone, motion-detecting accelerometer, speech-detecting accelerometer 1st gen: Dual optical sensors, force sensor 2nd gen: Skin-detect sensor, touch control
- Connectivity: AirPods (each); 1st gen: Bluetooth 5; 2nd gen: Bluetooth 5.3; 2nd gen (USB-C): 5 GHz radio Charging case 1st gen: Lightning port, Qi, MagSafe (after October 2021); 2nd gen: Lightning port (before September 2023) / USB-C port (after September 2023), Qi, MagSafe, Apple Watch charger, Ultra-wideband
- Current firmware: 1st gen: 6F21; 2nd gen: 8B41; 3rd gen: 8B41
- Dimensions: AirPods: (each); 1.22 × 0.86 × 0.94 in (30.9 × 21.8 × 24.0 mm); Charging case: 1.78 × 2.39 × 0.85 in (45.2 × 60.6 × 21.7 mm)
- Weight: AirPods: (each); 1st gen: 0.19 oz (5.4 g); 2nd gen: 0.19 oz (5.3 g); Charging case: 1st gen: 1.61 oz (45.6 g); 2nd gen: 1.79 oz (50.8 g)
- Model Number: AirPods Pro 3 Model number: A3063, A3064, A3065; Year introduced: 2025; AirPods Pro 2 with MagSafe Charging Case (USB-C); Model number: A3047, A3048, A3049; Year introduced: 2023; AirPods Pro 2 with MagSafe Charging Case (Lightning); Model number: A2931, A2699, A2698; Year introduced: 2022; AirPods Pro 1 Model number: A2084, A2083; Year introduced: 2019; MagSafe Charging Case for AirPods Pro 3 Model number: A3122; Year introduced: 2025; MagSafe Charging Case (USB-C) for AirPods Pro 2 Model number: A2968; Year introduced: 2023; MagSafe Charging Case (Lightning) for AirPods Pro 2 Model number: A2700; Year introduced: 2022; MagSafe Charging Case for AirPods Pro 1 Model number: A2190; Year introduced: 2021; AirPods Pro 1 Charging Case; Model number: A2190; Year introduced: 2019; Works with AirPods Pro
- Related: AirPods, AirPods Max
- Website: apple.com/airpods-pro

AirPods Pro are wireless Bluetooth in-ear headphones designed by Apple, initially introduced on October 30, 2019. They are Apple's mid-range wireless headphones, available alongside the base-level AirPods and the highest-end AirPods Max.

The first-generation AirPods Pro use the H1 chip, also found in the second-generation base-level AirPods. Notable additions include active noise cancellation, transparency mode, automated frequency profile adjustment, IPX4 water resistance, a charging case supporting wireless charging, and interchangeable silicone ear tips.

In September 2022, Apple announced the second-generation AirPods Pro in a special event. The newer iteration incorporates the H2 chip, Bluetooth 5.3 connectivity, improved sound quality and noise cancellation capabilities, an extended battery life, volume adjusting gestures, support Find My tracking, provide compatibility with Apple Watch chargers, and extra-small sized ear tips. A revision in 2023 added IP54 dust resistance, support for lossless audio in conjunction with the Apple Vision Pro, and a USB-C charging case.

In September 2025, Apple released the AirPods Pro 3. These AirPods were the first with heart rate monitoring, live voice AI translation (also featured on AirPods 4 with ANC), and improved hearing health features.

== Models ==
=== First Generation ===
Apple announced AirPods Pro on October 28, 2019, and released them two days later on October 30, 2019. They include features of standard AirPods, such as a microphone. They also have noise cancellation to reduce exterior sounds background noise, accelerometers and optical sensors that can detect presses on the stem and in-ear placement, and automatic pausing when they are taken out of the ears. Control by tapping is replaced by pressing a force sensor on the stems. They are rated IPX4 for water resistance.

The AirPods Pro use the H1 chip also found in the second- and third-generation AirPods, that supports hands-free "Hey Siri". They have active noise cancellation, accomplished by microphones detecting outside sound and speakers producing precisely opposite "anti-noise". Active noise cancellation can be turned off or switched to "transparency mode" that helps users hear surroundings. Noise cancellation modes can also be switched in iOS or by pinching the stems of the AirPods using the force sensor.

The H1 chip is embedded in a unique system in a package (SiP) module enclosing several other components, such as the audio processor and accelerometers.

Battery life is rated to be equal to the second-generation AirPods at five hours, but noise cancellation or transparency mode reduce it to 4.5 hours due to the extra processing. The charging case advertises the same 24 hours of total listening time as the standard AirPods case. It also features Qi standard wireless charging compatibility. In October 2021, Apple updated the bundled charging case with MagSafe. Like AirPods, AirPods Pro have received criticism for their battery life.

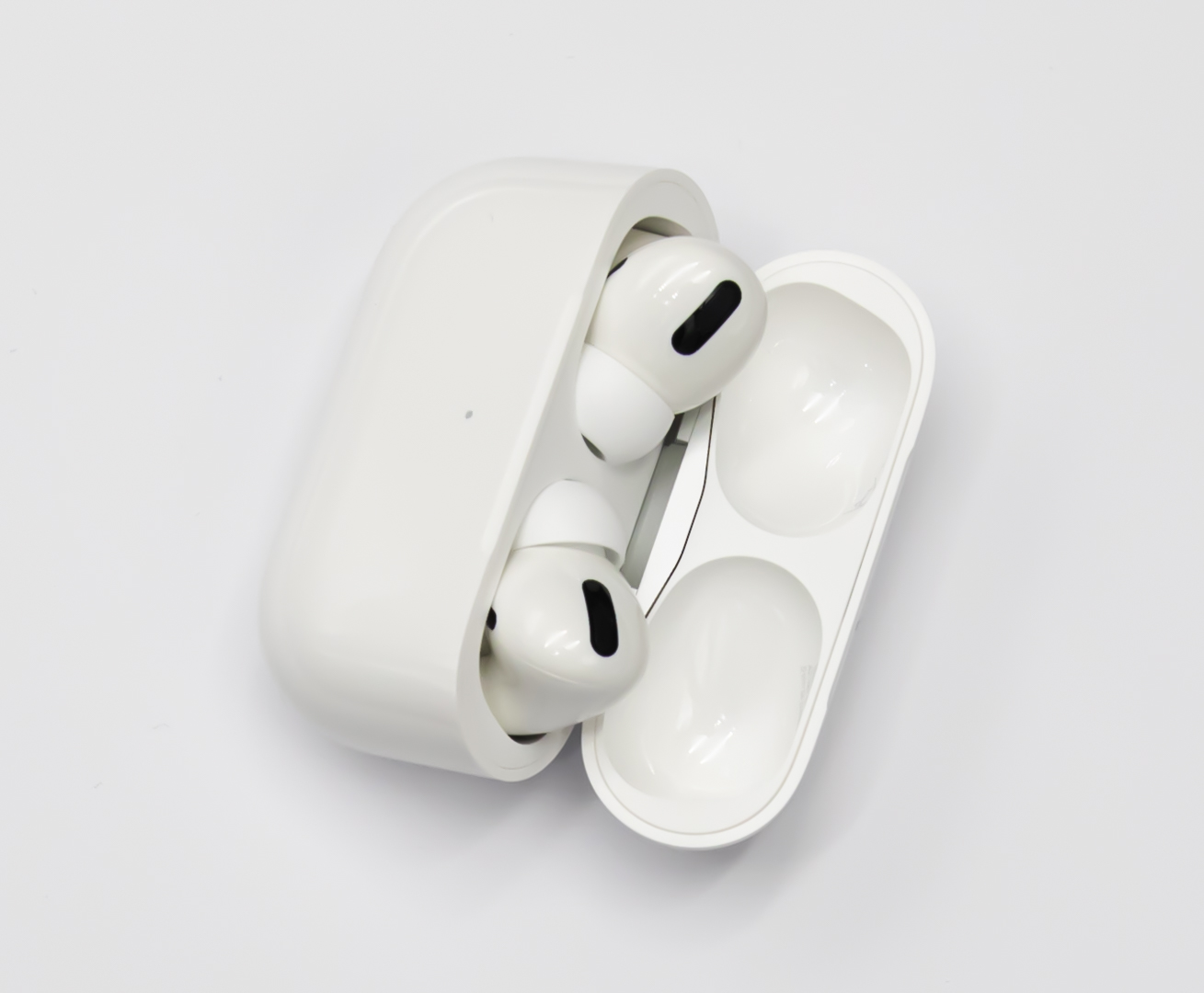
AirPods Pro Gen 1s in their charging case

AirPods Pro come with three sizes of silicone tips, including the attached medium set. There is a software test in iOS called the Ear Tip Fit Test that "checks the fit of your AirPods ear tips to determine which size provides the best seal and acoustic performance" to ensure a correct fit, as well as a feature called "Adaptive EQ" which automatically adjusts the frequency contour, claimed to better match the wearer's ear shape. Starting in early 2020, Apple started selling tip replacements for AirPods Pro on their website.

With iOS 14 and iPadOS 14, Apple added a spatial audio mode designed to simulate 5.1 surround sound. Supported apps include the Apple TV app, Disney+, HBO Max and Netflix. Spatial audio requires an iPhone, iPad or Apple TV with an Apple A10 processor or newer.

Illustrations of the H1 SiP

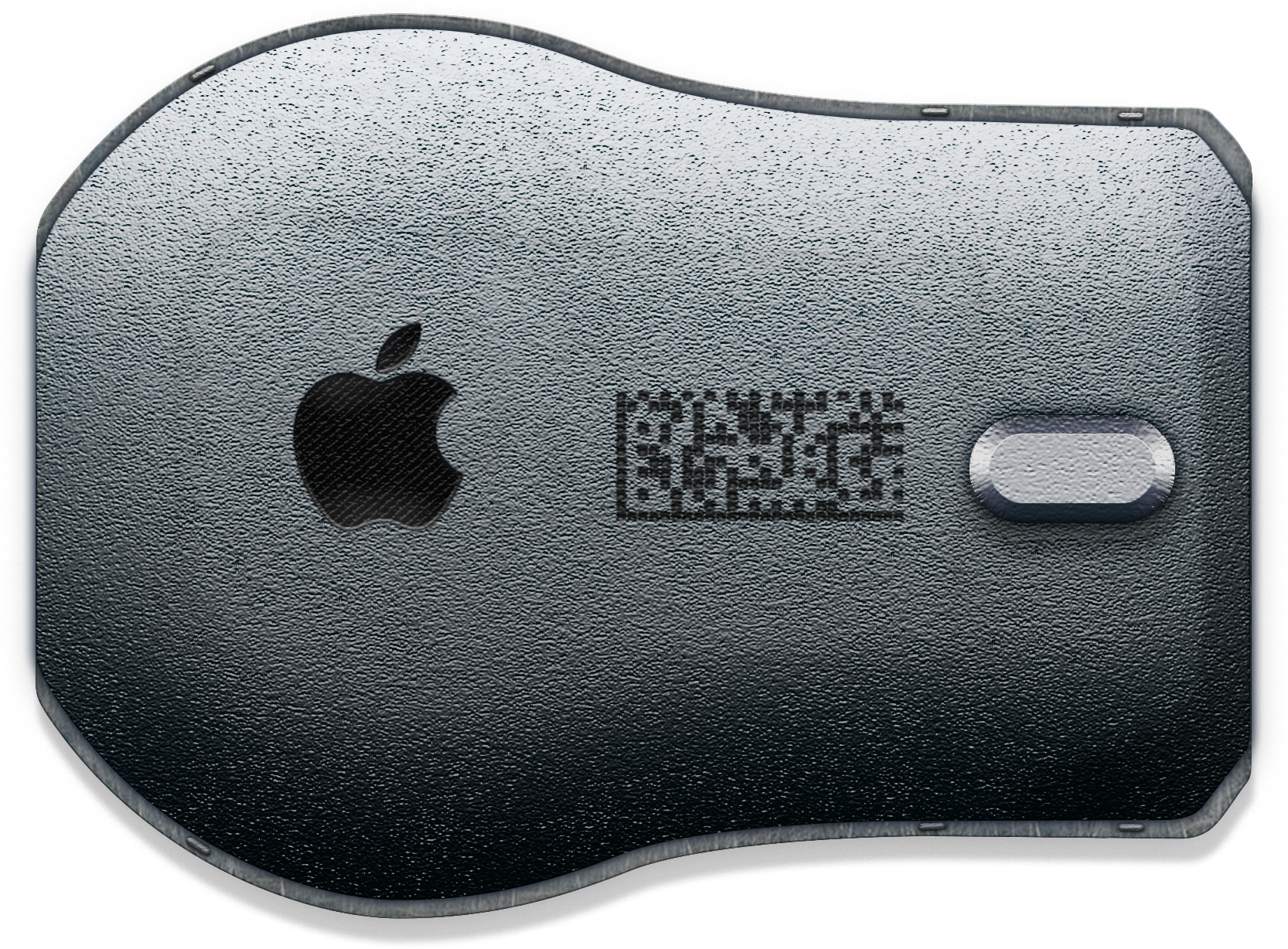
SiP from the top, showing the part containing the audio processors

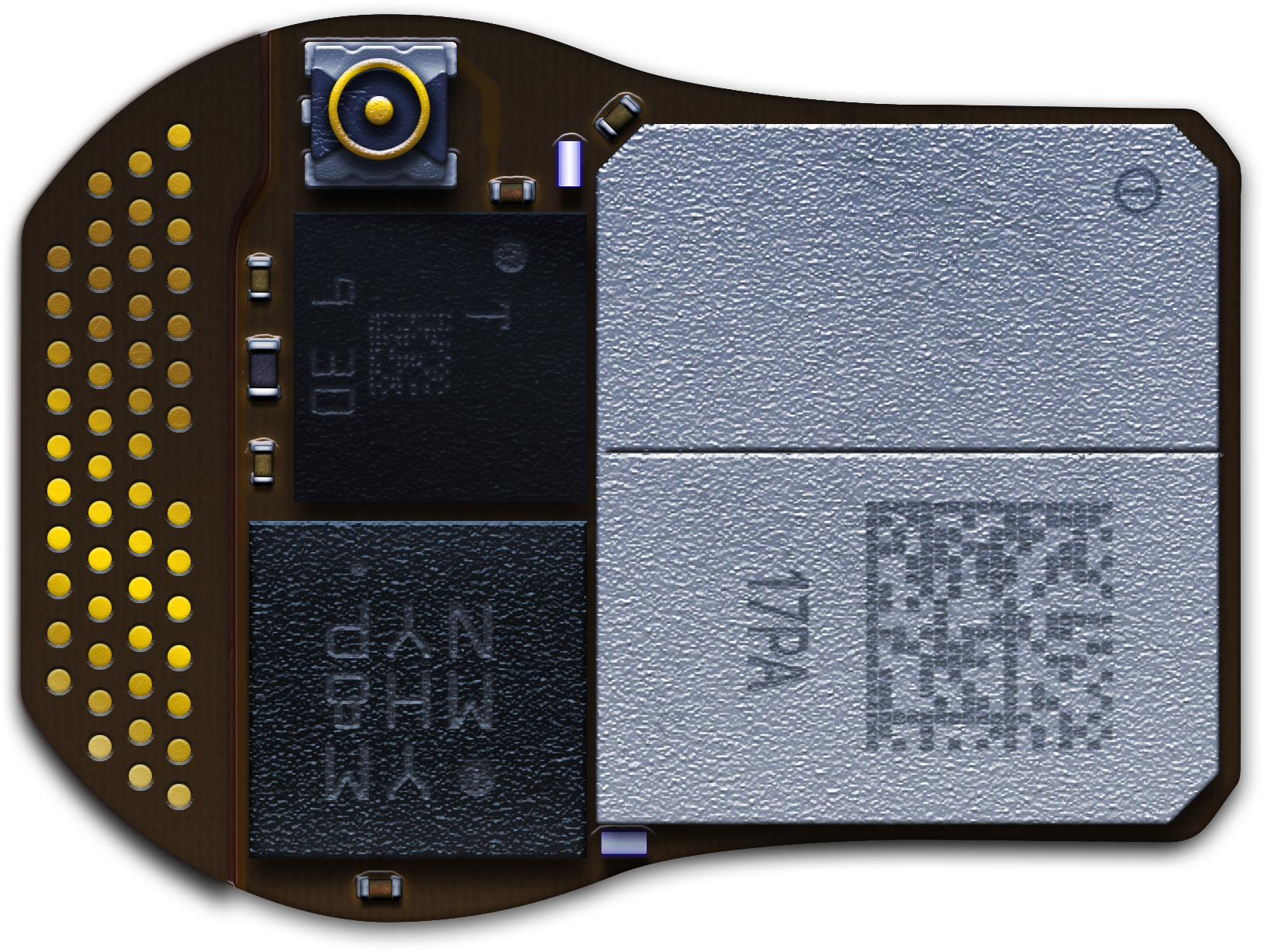
SiP from the bottom, showing the H1 enclosure, the two accelerometers, the Bluetooth antenna connector and the large pad attaching a flex cable to all other components in the headphone

iOS 14 also added the ability to apply headphone accommodations to transparency mode, allowing the AirPods Pro to act as rudimentary hearing aids. In October 2021, a new Conversation Boost mode was added as a customization of the regular Transparency mode. It boosts voices above background noise and music.

Carlos Gordoa and Ariani Reyes of Texas claimed on May, 17th, 2020, their child, B. Gordoa, 12 years old at the time suffered a ruptured eardrum and inner ear damage, resulting in permanent hearing loss and tinnitus, when an Amber alert for 14-month-old Edgar Nathaniel Jesus Collins was pushed through his first generation AirPods Pro at an "ear-shattering volume", while his Netflix volume was low. Apple has since won the lawsuit in 2025.

=== Second Generation ===
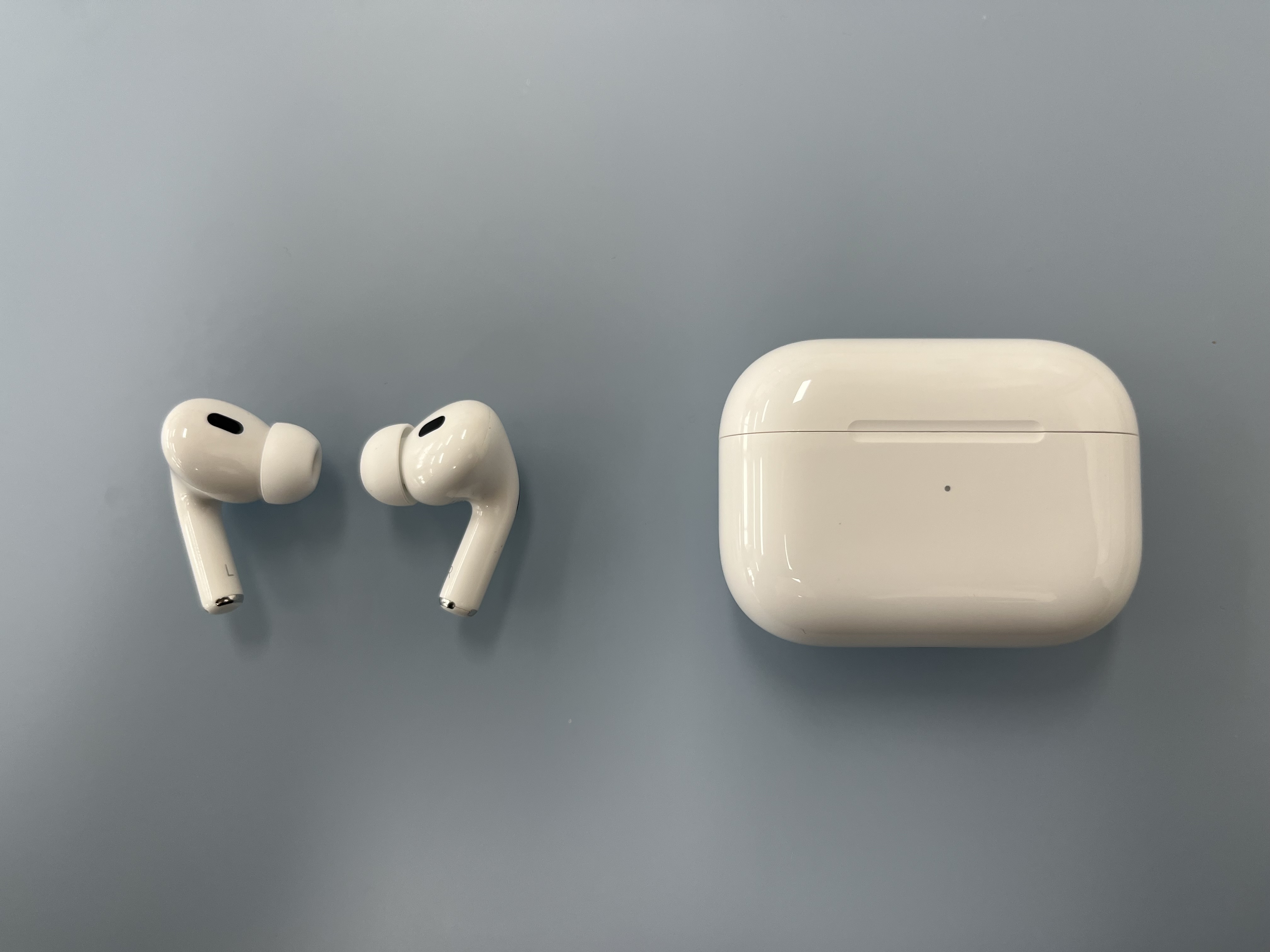
Units and charging case of second-generation AirPods Pro

The second-generation AirPods Pro were announced at an Apple media event on September 7, 2022, and were released on September 23, 2022. They use an updated H2 chip with Bluetooth 5.3 connectivity, and feature improved sound quality and noise cancellation, and longer battery life. They also include extra-small sized ear tips, and AirPods support swiping up and down to adjust volume. Ear tips are physically compatible with first generation AirPods Pro as they use the same connector, but Apple notes the second generation ear tips use a less dense mesh and recommends against intermixing them for acoustical consistency.

The charging case includes the Apple U1 chip that supports Find My tracking, and includes a speaker for locating and status updates. In addition to Lightning, Qi and MagSafe chargers, it is also compatible with Apple Watch chargers. A lanyard loop was also added to the side of the case.

In September 2023, Apple updated the second-generation AirPods Pro with improved IP54 dust resistance, an updated H2 chip that supports the 5 GHz band for lossless audio with the Apple Vision Pro, and a charging case with a USB-C port instead of a Lightning port.

iOS 17 added "Adaptive Audio," which dynamically blends Transparency and Active Noise Cancellation to tailor the noise control experience as a user moves between changing environments; "Press" to answer/mute/end a call; "Personalized volume" which uses machine learning to adjust volume based on user preferences over time and surroundings; "Conversation awareness" which automatically lowers the volume if the user starts talking to someone nearby. In iOS 18, a user can nod or shake their head to respond when talking to Siri and Voice Isolation during phone calls was also introduced. In September 2024, the United States Food and Drug Administration authorized the use of hearing aid software by Apple in the AirPods Pro.

=== Third Generation ===
The AirPods Pro 3 were introduced on September 9, 2025, and released on September 19, 2025. This version continues to use the H2 chip. It has a new heart rate sensor, and Apple advertises that it has two times better noise cancelling capabilities compared to the AirPods Pro 2, and four times better than the AirPods Pro 1. AirPods Pro 3 also come with a new live translation feature. Apple introduced a new form factor that they claimed can fit better in most people's ears. Along with the redesign, new silicone ear tips were introduced with a foam interior for improved noise canceling ability.

== Compatibility ==
Support for AirPods Pro was added in iOS 13.2, watchOS 6.1, tvOS 13.2, and macOS Catalina 10.15.1. They are compatible with any device that supports Bluetooth, including Windows and Android devices, although certain features such as automatic switching between devices and single-AirPod listening are only available on Apple devices using its iCloud service.

Legend	Discontinued and unsupported	Discontinued but supported	Current	Upcoming

Comparative technical specifications of all AirPods models
Model			iPhone Bluetooth Headset	AirPods (1st gen)	AirPods (2nd gen)	AirPods Pro (1st gen)	AirPods Max with Lightning	AirPods (3rd gen)	AirPods Pro 2	AirPods 4	AirPods 4 with ANC	AirPods Max with USB-C	AirPods Pro 3	AirPods Max 2
Timeline	Announced		January 9, 2007	September 7, 2016	March 20, 2019	October 28, 2019	December 8, 2020	October 18, 2021	September 7, 2022	September 9, 2024			September 9, 2025	March 16, 2026
Timeline	Released		June 29, 2007	December 13, 2016	March 20, 2019	October 30, 2019	December 15, 2020	October 26, 2021	September 23, 2022	September 20, 2024			September 19, 2025	April 1, 2026
Timeline	Discontinued		March 23, 2009	March 20, 2019	September 9, 2024	September 7, 2022	September 9, 2024	September 9, 2024	September 9, 2025	In production		March 16, 2026	In production	
Model	Model number	L	A1221	A1722	A2031	A2084	A2096	A2564	A2931, A2699, A2698	A3053, A3050, A3054	A3056, A3055, A3057	A3184	A3064	A3454
Model	Model number	R	A1221	A1523	A2032	A2083	A2096	A2565	A2931, A2699, A2698	A3053, A3050, A3054	A3056, A3055, A3057	A3184	A3063	A3454
Model	Model number	Case	A1221	A1602 (Lightning)	A1602 (Lightning); A1938 (Qi, Lightning)	A2190 (Qi, Lightning); A2190 (MagSafe, Lightning)	A2096	A2897 (Lightning); A2566 (MagSafe, Lightning)	A2700 (MagSafe, Lightning); A2968 (MagSafe, USB-C)	A3058 (USB-C)	A3059 (Qi, USB-C)	A3184	A3122	A3454
Model	Model identifier		[data missing]	AirPods1,1	AirPods2,1	AirPodsPro1,1; Airpods2,2 iProd8,1	AirpodsMax1,1 iProd8,6	AirPods1,3; Audio2,1	AirPodsPro1,2; AirPods3,1	AirPods1,4; AirPods3,2	AirPods1,5; AirPods3,3	AirPodsMax1,1	AirPodsPro1,3; AirPods3,4	AirPodsMax1,2; AirPods3,6
Model	Order numbers		MA817AM (with iPhone dual dock); MB536AM (without iPhone dual dock)	MMEF2AM	MV7N2AM (Lightning); MRXJ2AM (Qi)	MWP22AM	MGYJ3AM (silver); MGYH3AM (space gray); MGYL3AM (sky blue); MGYM3AM (pink); MGYN3AM (green)	MME73AM	MQD83AM (Lightning); MTJV3AM (USB-C)	MXP63LL	MXP93LL	MWW43AM (midnight); MWW53AM (starlight); MWW63AM (blue); MWW73AM (orange); MWW83AM (purple)	MFHP4LL	MHWK4AM (midnight); MHWL4AM (starlight); MHWM4AM (blue); MHWN4AM (orange); MHWP4AM (purple)
Compatibility	Bluetooth		Bluetooth 2.0	Bluetooth 4.0	Bluetooth 5.0				Bluetooth 5.3			Bluetooth 5.0	Bluetooth 5.3	
Compatibility	OS support for Siri		—N/a	iOS 10 watchOS 3 macOS Sierra	iOS 12.2 watchOS 5.2 macOS Mojave 10.14.4	iOS 13.2 watchOS 6.1 tvOS 13.2 macOS Catalina 10.15.1	iOS 14.3 iPadOS 14.3 watchOS 7.2 tvOS 14 macOS Big Sur	iOS 15.1 iPadOS 15.1 watchOS 8.1 tvOS 15.1 macOS Monterey 12.0						
System on a chip			None	Apple W1 chip	Apple H1 chip				Apple H2 chip			Apple H1 chip	Apple H2 chip	
Battery	Power	Per AirPod	[data missing]	0.093 Wh		0.16 Wh	2 × 2.53 Wh (right ear cup)	0.133 Wh	0.182 Wh	?		2 × 2.53 Wh (right ear cup)	0.221 Wh	2 × 2.53 Wh (right ear cup)
Battery	Power	Case	[data missing]	1.52 Wh		1.98 Wh	2 × 2.53 Wh (right ear cup)	1.33 Wh	1.997 Wh	?		2 × 2.53 Wh (right ear cup)	1.334 Wh	2 × 2.53 Wh (right ear cup)
Battery	Capacity		No case	398 mAh (case)		519 mAh (case)	664 mAh (right ear cup)	345 mAh (case)	523 mAh (case); 2 × 49.7 mAh (earbuds)	?		664 mAh (right ear cup)	344.58 mAh (case); 2 × 58 mAh (earbuds)	664 mAh (right ear cup)
Firmware	Original release		Not upgradable	3.3.1	6.3.2	2B584	3C16	3E751	5A374	8B39	8B39	7A291	8A357	8E258
Firmware	Latest / final		Not upgradable	6.8.8	6F21	6F21	6F25	6F21	8B41	8B39	8B39	7E108	8B41	8E258
Introductory US Price			$129	$159	$159	$249	$549	$179	$249	$129	$179	$549	$249	$549

== See also ==
- Apple headphones
  - EarPods
  - AirPods
  - AirPods Max
- Google Pixel Buds
- Samsung Galaxy Buds
