= IPhone SE =

Discontinued series of smartphones by Apple

The iPhone SE is a discontinued series of budget smartphones, part of the iPhone family developed by Apple. It may refer to:

- iPhone SE (1st generation), released in 2016
- iPhone SE (2nd generation), released in 2020
- iPhone SE (3rd generation), released in 2022
