= IPhone 16e =

2025 smartphone by Apple

iPhone 16e

- iPhone 16e in White
- Developer: Apple
- Type: Smartphone
- Series: iPhone
- First released: February 28, 2025; 20 months ago
- Discontinued: March 2, 2026; 8 months ago
- Predecessor: iPhone SE (3rd generation) and iPhone 14
- Successor: iPhone 17e
- Related: iPhone 16 and 16 Plus iPhone 16 Pro and Pro Max
- Compatible networks: 2G GSM/EDGE, 3G UMTS/HSPA+, 4G LTE, 5G NR
- Form factor: Slate
- Colors: White; Black
- Dimensions: 146.7 × 71.5 × 7.8 mm (5.78 × 2.81 × 0.31 in)
- Weight: 167 g (5.9 oz)
- Operating system: Original: iOS 18.3; Current: iOS 27.2, released October 26, 2026
- System-on-chip: Apple A18
- Modem: Apple C1
- Memory: 8 GB LPDDR5X
- Storage: 128, 256 or 512 GB NVMe
- SIM: Dual eSIM (US); Dual nano-SIM (mainland China); nano-SIM and eSIM (elsewhere)
- Battery: 15.55 W⋅h (4005 mA⋅h) Li-ion @ 3.88 V
- Charging: Qi wireless up to 7.5 W; USB-C
- Rear camera: 48 MP, f/1.6, 26 mm (wide)
- Front camera: 12 MP, f/1.9, 23 mm (wide)
- Display: 6.1 in (150 mm); 2532 × 1170 resolution at 60 Hz
- Sound: Dolby Atmos-tuned Spatial Audio
- Connectivity: Wi-Fi 6 (802.11a/b/g/n/ac/ax) dual-band Bluetooth 5.3 (A2DP, LE); NFC (reader mode, Express Cards); USB-C: USB 2.0 480 Mbit/s; GPS, GLONASS, Galileo, QZSS, BeiDou, NavIC
- Water resistance: IP68 dust/water resistant (up to 6 m for 30 min)
- Other: Emergency SOS, Messages and Find My via satellite, Action Button, FaceTime Audio or Video at 1080p over Wi-Fi and 5G, Voice over 5G Standalone (if supported by the carrier)
- Website: iPhone 16e - Apple at the Wayback Machine (archived February 19, 2025)

The iPhone 16e is a smartphone developed and marketed by Apple as part of its iPhone series. It is part of the eighteenth-generation iPhone line-up, together with the iPhone 16, the iPhone 16 Plus, and the Pro models, the iPhone 16 Pro and iPhone 16 Pro Max. Announced on February 19, 2025, as part of the iPhone 16 line-up, the iPhone 16e was released with a starting price of US$599, marking a US$170 increase over the starting price of the iPhone SE (3rd generation), or a US$120 increase over the price of the comparable 128 GB of storage version of that iPhone.

The iPhone 16e is the entry-level model of the iPhone 16 line-up, featuring an edge-to-edge display (albeit retaining the iPhone 14's notch instead of the Dynamic Island on the iPhone 14 Pro and iPhone 15 and 16 lines), Face ID, and a USB-C port instead of Lightning. It shares its dimensions and front design with the 2021 iPhone 13, iPhone 13 Pro, and 2022 iPhone 14. Compared to the standard iPhone 16 and iPhone 16 Pro, the iPhone 16e omits features such as Camera Control, an ultra-wide camera, an ultra-wideband chip, and support for Qi2 and MagSafe charging, and is the last iPhone to not feature MagSafe. The iPhone 16e is positioned similarly to the entry-level iPhone 5c, which launched alongside the iPhone 5s with fewer features, and subsequent iPhone SE models.

Powered by the A18 chip (with four GPU cores instead of five, unlike the regular iPhone 16), it features an action button replacing the mute switch, a single 48 MP Fusion camera with optical zoom options (1x and 2x), a custom Apple C1 cellular modem, and support for Apple Intelligence.

Following the iPhone 16e's announcement, the iPhone 14, iPhone 14 Plus, and iPhone SE (3rd generation) were discontinued, completing the transition from Lightning to USB-C across all iPhone models starting with the iPhone 15. The iPhone 16e was discontinued on March 2, 2026, with the release of the iPhone 17e.

== History ==
The successor to the iPhone SE (3rd generation) was originally rumored to be named as "iPhone SE 4", but was later renamed as "iPhone 16e". The "e" in iPhone 16e stands for "economical".

Prior to the renaming, rumors as early as January 2025 suggests that the "iPhone SE 4" would be named as the "iPhone 16e".

Subsequent build numbers for the unreleased iPhone SE 4 were revealed in IOS 18.3 ahead of its unveiling.

In February 2025, MacRumors reported that the unreleased iPhone SE 4 would debut as soon as next week, with reports suggests a product briefing. Soon after, Tim Cook tweeted an 'Apple Launch' set for February 19, 2025.

A day before its launch, rumors suggests that the "iPhone 16E" name was more likely to be named instead of "iPhone SE 4".

On February 19, 2025, Apple announced the successor to the third generation iPhone SE, being named as "iPhone 16e", which serves as the entry-level model of the iPhone 16 series.

Apple started taking pre-orders on February 21, 2025, with general availability on February 28, 2025.

The iPhone 16e was quietly discontinued and removed from Apple's website on March 2, 2026, following the announcement of the iPhone 17e.

== Design ==
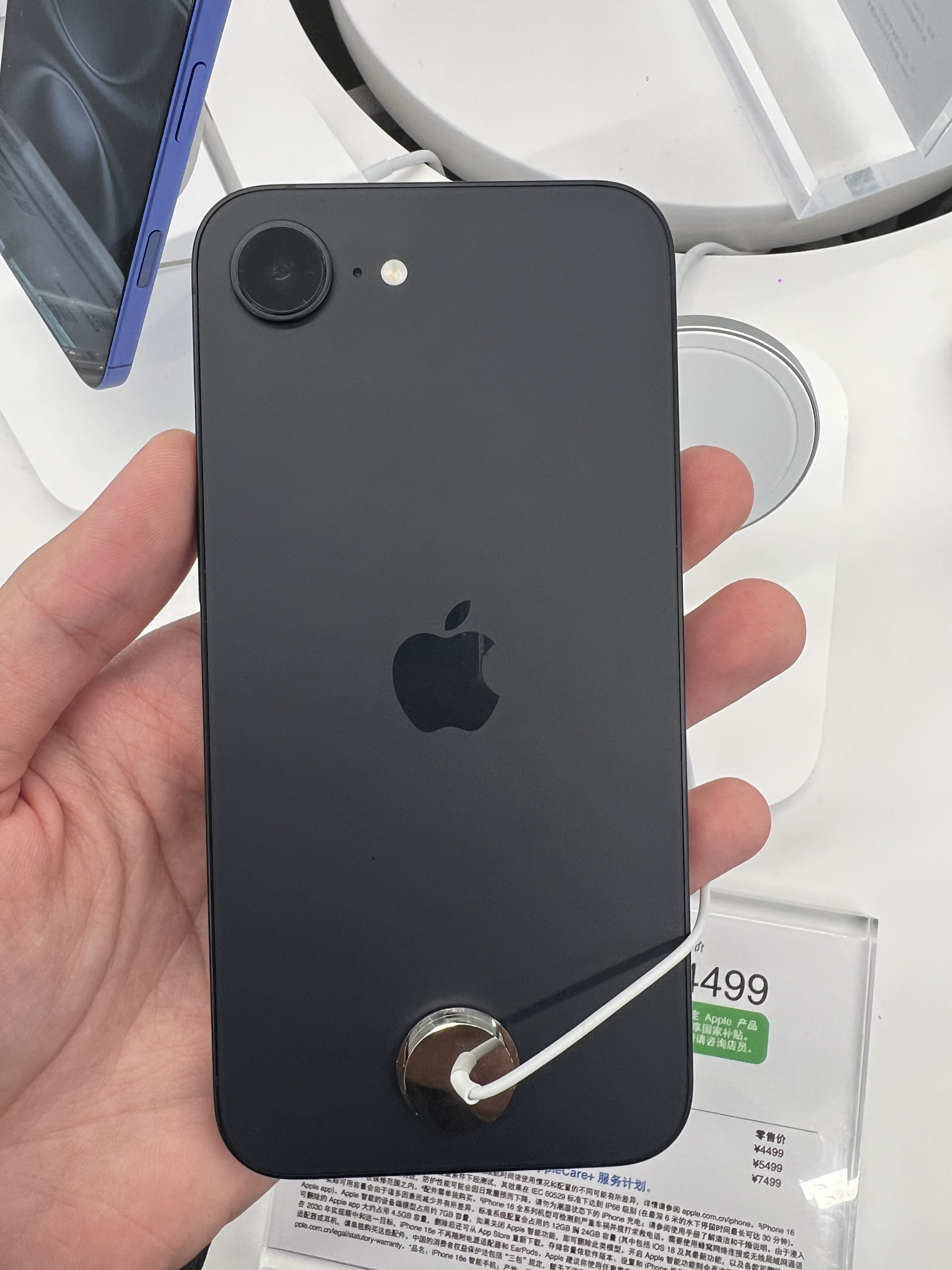
The backside of the iPhone 16e in Black

The iPhone 16e features an aluminium frame accompanied by a glass front and matte finished back glass featuring a ceramic protective coating. It also shares the same physical sizes and dimensions as the iPhone 13, iPhone 13 Pro and iPhone 14.

The iPhone 16e is available in two colors: Black and White, reminiscent of the iPhone X, iPhone 3GS, iPhone 4 and iPhone 4s.

Color	Name
	White
	Black

== Specifications ==
=== Hardware ===
The iPhone 16e incorporates the Apple A18 system on a chip (SoC) with 4-core GPU. It is available in three internal storage configurations: 128 GB, 256 GB, and 512 GB. It has 8 GB of RAM, twice that of the third-generation iPhone SE's 4 GB of RAM. The iPhone 16e also has an IP68 rating for dust and water resistance.

To lower production costs, Apple used binned A18 chips retained from iPhone 16 production. On these chips, one of the five GPU cores was defective and had been rejected during manufacturing. With that core disabled, the chips were configured as four-core GPUs for use in the iPhone 16e. Because Apple had already paid for the chips during iPhone 16 production, they carried no additional procurement cost.

The iPhone 16e also features an Apple-designed modem, the Apple C1, instead of the Qualcomm modem found in all iPhone models since the iPhone 12 and including the iPhone 16 and iPhone 16 Pro. However, this resulted in the iPhone 16e not supporting mmWave 5G, unlike its flagship counterparts.

Like the previous SE models, the iPhone 16e lacks the ultra-wideband features enabled by the U2 chip which is found in other iPhone models since the iPhone 11.

The iPhone 16e International model has Nano-SIM + eSIM + eSIM support, whereas the US model is eSIM only and the Chinese model does not have any eSIM support.

The iPhone 16e has been designed with a USB-C port rather than the older and proprietary Lightning port. However, the iPhone 16e's USB-C port does not support DisplayPort video output.

Like the iPhone 15 Pro and all models of the iPhone 16 and 17 series, the iPhone 16e features the action button replacing the mute switch.

Unlike the standard iPhone 16 and 16 Pro, the iPhone 16e lacks the Camera Control, so Visual Intelligence can only be triggered using the Action Button, or with the default button in the Control Centre.

==== Display ====
The iPhone 16e features a Super Retina XDR display, using an OLED panel rather than the iPhone SE line's LCD. The display has a resolution of 2532 × 1170 pixels, with a diagonal size of 6.1 in (150 mm) and a pixel density of 460 PPI. It can play HDR10, HDR10+, and Dolby Vision content. The display panel is identical to the one found on the iPhone 14 and is cross-compatible.

Unlike the other models of the iPhone 16 series, the iPhone 16e maintains the notch (a narrower notch design found on the iPhone 13, iPhone 13 Pro and iPhone 14, first introduced with the iPhone X in 2017) instead of the Dynamic Island (first introduced with the iPhone 14 Pro in 2022).

==== Camera ====
The iPhone 16e has a 2-in-1 rear 48 MP Fusion camera with a single lens. Like the iPhone 15 and iPhone 16, it has optical-quality zoom in up to 2x, done by cropping a portion of the sensor. It is capable of recording 4K video at 24, 25, 30, or 60 fps, 1080p HD video at 25, 30 or 60 fps, or 720p HD video at 30 fps. The camera has an aperture of f/1.6, autofocus, optical image stabilization, and a dual-LED True Tone flash. The front camera is a 12 MP TrueDepth module with an aperture of f/1.9 and autofocus, capable of shooting 4K video at 25, 30 or 60 fps and slow-motion video at 120 fps.

The iPhone 16e adds several camera functions enabled by the A18 with 4-core GPU (an entry-level successor to the A15 Bionic with 4-core GPU). Like the iPhone 16 and iPhone 16 Pro, the rear camera supports Smart HDR 5, spatial audio recording, wind noise reduction, audio zoom and audio mix. Both the front and rear cameras of the iPhone 16e support Portrait mode and Portrait Lighting. However, the 16e's implementation of Portrait mode only supports human faces and lacks an option to change the focus point. Like the iPhone 16 and iPhone 16 Pro, Portrait mode has depth control and an advanced bokeh effect (blurring effect of the out-of-focus background around the portrait). The iPhone 16e supports Photonic Engine, Deep Fusion, Photographic Styles, and Night Mode but lacks some features such as Cinematic Mode and Action Mode.

==== Battery and charging ====
The iPhone 16e has a video playback duration up to 26 hours and an audio playback duration up to 90 hours.

Unlike other models in the family, the iPhone 16e does not have MagSafe connectivity. However, the iPhone still supports standard wireless charging up to 7.5 W, via the Qi standard.

=== Software ===
The iPhone 16e was originally supplied with iOS 18.3 for release on February 28, 2025, with a day one update available to iOS 18.3.1. It also supports iOS 26, and iOS 27.

Like both the iPhone 16 and iPhone 16 Pro, the iPhone 16e supports Apple Intelligence.

== Reception ==
iPhone 16e received generally positive reviews, with many praising the Apple C1 modem and battery life, but criticizing the price and compromises, particularly at the lack of MagSafe.

Patrick Holland at CNET gave it a score of 8.5 out of 10. Holland conducted a head-to-head test between iPhone 16e and iPhone 16 Pro Max to compare the download and upload speeds of iPhone 16e's Apple-designed C1 modem and iPhone 16 Pro Max's Qualcomm-designed modem. Holland conducted the test on AT&T's 5G network in both indoors and outdoors in San Francisco. Holland published the results of the test in a comparative table that shows iPhone 16e's Apple-designed C1 modem was able to match the download speed of iPhone 16 Pro Max's Qualcomm-designed modem, and iPhone 16e's Apple-designed C1 modem had a faster upload speed than iPhone 16 Pro Max's Qualcomm-designed modem.

The Verge gave it a score of 7 out of 10, calling the device familiar, but when compared to the iPhone 16, video call quality and upload speeds on the 16e "would come out ahead", although there wasn't a consistent difference.

Julian Chokkattu at Wired, also giving a score of 7 out of 10, was slightly more critical. Chokkattu said the US$599 price of the iPhone 16e felt $100 too high, and was for anyone who wanted a new phone that "just needs to be an iPhone." Chokkattu concluded that the 16e was perfectly reliable, but not a good value.

Preceded by iPhone SE (3rd)	iPhone; 18th generation alongside iPhone 16 / 16 Plus and iPhone 16 Pro / 16 Pro Max	Succeeded by IPhone 17e
