= 16e =

16e may refer to:

- 16th arrondissement of Paris, an administrative district
- iPhone 16e, a smartphone released in 2025
