= 17e =

17e may refer to:

- 17th arrondissement of Paris, an administrative district
- iPhone 17e, a smartphone released in 2026
