= IOS 26 =

2025 mobile operating system

iOS 26
- Version of the iOS operating system

- iOS 26 home screen on an iPhone 15
- Developer: Apple
- Written in: C; C++; Objective-C; Swift; assembly language
- OS family: iOS
- Source model: Closed with open-source components
- General availability: September 15, 2025; 13 months ago
- Latest release: 26.7.3 (November 9, 2026; 3 days ago) [±]
- Available in: 55 languages
- List of languages: Arabic; Bangla; Bulgarian; Catalan; Chinese, Simplified; Chinese, Traditional (Hong Kong); Chinese, Traditional (Taiwan); Croatian; Czech; Danish; Dutch; English (Australia); English (India); English (United Kingdom); English (United States); Finnish; French (Canada); French (France); German; Greek; Gujarati; Hebrew; Hindi; Hungarian; Indonesian; Italian; Japanese; Kannada; Kazakh; Korean; Lithuanian; Malay; Malayalam; Marathi; Norwegian; Odia; Polish; Portuguese (Brazil); Portuguese (Portugal); Punjabi; Romanian; Russian; Slovak; Slovenian; Spanish (Latin America); Spanish (Spain); Spanish (United States); Swedish; Tamil; Telugu; Thai; Turkish; Ukrainian; Urdu; Vietnamese
- Supported platforms: iPhone
- Preceded by: iOS 18
- Succeeded by: iOS 27
- Official website: iOS 26 at the Wayback Machine (archived June 7, 2026)
- Tagline: New look. Even more magic.

Support status
- Receiving OTA only security updates with no IPSW files since all iPhones that support iOS 26 support iOS 27. Listed less prominently in the Software Update Screen to push iOS 26 users to upgrade to iOS 27. Widespread third-party app support.

Articles in the series

iOS 26 is the nineteenth major release of Apple's iOS operating system for the iPhone. It was announced at the 2025 Worldwide Developers Conference (WWDC) on June 9, 2025, and released on September 15, 2025. The successor to iOS 18, its version number was brought forward to 26 as Apple adopted a year-based convention for consistency across its operating systems.

iOS 26 introduces the Liquid Glass design language that is shared across all other Apple platforms, marking the first major redesign of the user interface since iOS 7. The Wallet app introduces an enhanced boarding pass with the ability to track and share flight status using Live Activities. New Apple Intelligence features include additional ChatGPT integration in Visual Intelligence, now usable when taking screenshots, and the ability for third-party apps to integrate the Apple Intelligence framework.

This release was widely received with mixed critical and user reception. Some reviewers highlighted its quality-of-life improvements; while some reviewers and users were critical of its controversial Liquid Glass interface and usability. iOS 26 was succeeded by iOS 27 in September 2026.

== Features ==
=== System features ===
==== User interface ====
With iOS 26, Apple introduced Liquid Glass, a design language that spans its software platforms and is inspired by visionOS. Its rounded, translucent interface elements respond to content and motion and have been deployed across system interfaces and applications such as Camera and Safari. The redesign also features an adaptive Lock Screen clock and a Clear appearance for Home Screen icons.

Accessibility and system functionality

iOS 26 introduces new accessibility features such as system-wide Reader Mode, Braille Access, and Head Tracking. The system also adds support for Adaptive Power on compatible devices, Wi-Fi Aware, HDR screenshots and screen recordings, as well as direct eSIM transfer between compatible iPhone and Android devices.

==== Apple Intelligence ====
iOS 26 introduces new Apple Intelligence features; Apple Intelligence models were made more efficient and support additional languages. It supports live translation of voice and text conversations using on-device models, and Genmoji can now be invoked to merge existing emojis together rather than needing to use a prompt. Visual Intelligence and Image Playground also feature additional ChatGPT integration.

The framework allows Apple Intelligence features to be integrated into third-party apps; Apple said that a Swift app can implement the framework with as little as three lines of code.

=== Ringtones ===
New ringtones have been introduced for the first time since iOS 17, including six variations of the "Reflection" ringtone: "Buoyant", "Dreamer", "Pond, "Pop", "Reflected", and "Surge".

=== App features ===
Communication

The Phone app includes a new optional unified layout of Favourites, Recents and Voicemail, plus Call Screening and Hold Assist. Live Translation provides real-time translation during supported calls. The Messages app also introduces features to screen unknown senders, conversation backgrounds, polls, group typing indicators, and live translation.

Media and photography

The Music app includes beat matching and time stretching for seamless song transitions with AutoMix, as well as translated lyrics and pronunciation guides. The Photos app has a redesigned interface and a new spatial scenes feature, which adds a depth effect to images. Camera has been redesigned with simplified access to its main Photo and Video modes and reorganized camera controls.

Maps and other applications

Maps adds “Preferred Routes”, which can learn frequently used routes and provide information about delays. Notes adds call transcription and Markdown export, while Passwords includes password history. Safari adds support for HDR images and SVG icons, while Home ends support for the legacy Apple Home architecture. Files, Clock, Podcasts, Reminders and Shortcuts also received updates.

=== Security and privacy ===
iOS 26 also brings new security and privacy features, such as managing wired accessories when an iPhone is locked. A single location is also available for blocked contacts. Recovery Assistant can try to recover a device that doesn't start normally. The OS also introduces quantum-secure key exchange for TLS 1.3.

== Supported devices ==
iOS 26 requires an iPhone with an Apple A13 Bionic chip or newer with at least 3 GB of RAM, thus dropping support for all iPhones with the Apple A12 Bionic SoC, including the iPhone XS, XS Max, and XR, thus ending support for all iPhones that use 3D Touch. Apple Intelligence features require an Apple A17 Pro chip or newer with at least 8 GB of RAM.

Supported device	Chipset	RAM	Apple Intelligence support
iPhone 11	A13	4 GB	No
iPhone 11 Pro & 11 Pro Max	A13	4 GB	No
iPhone SE (2nd generation)	A13	3 GB	No
iPhone 12 & 12 Mini	A14	4 GB	No
iPhone 12 Pro & 12 Pro Max	A14	6 GB	No
iPhone 13 & 13 Mini	A15	4 GB	No
iPhone 13 Pro & 13 Pro Max	A15	6 GB	No
iPhone SE (3rd generation)	A15	4 GB	No
iPhone 14 & 14 Plus	A15	6 GB	No
iPhone 14 Pro & 14 Pro Max	A16	6 GB	No
iPhone 15 & 15 Plus	A16	6 GB	No
iPhone 15 Pro & 15 Pro Max	A17 Pro	8 GB	Yes
iPhone 16 & 16 Plus	A18	8 GB	Yes
iPhone 16 Pro & 16 Pro Max	A18 Pro	8 GB	Yes
iPhone 16e	A18	8 GB	Yes
iPhone 17	A19	8 GB	Yes
iPhone 17 Pro & 17 Pro Max	A19 Pro	12 GB	Yes
iPhone Air	A19 Pro	12 GB	Yes
iPhone 17e	A19	8 GB	Yes

== Version history ==
iOS 26 release history
Version	Build	Release date	Notes
26.0	23A330	—N/a	Preinstalled on iPhone 17, 17 Pro, 17 Pro Max and Air
26.0	23A341	September 15, 2025	Developer release notes Release notes Security content
26.0	23A345	September 18, 2025	iPhone 17 Pro models only
26.0.1	23A355	September 29, 2025	Release notes Security content
26.1	23B85	November 3, 2025	Developer release notes Release notes Security content
26.2	23C55	December 12, 2025	Developer release notes Release notes Security content
26.2.1	23C71	January 26, 2026	Support for AirTag 2 Release notes
26.3	23D127	February 11, 2026	Developer release notes Security content
26.3	23D8128	—N/a	Preinstalled on iPhone 17e
26.3.1	23D8133	March 4, 2026	
26.3.1 (a)	23D771330a	March 17, 2026	Background Security Improvement Security content
26.4	23E246	March 24, 2026	Developer release notes Security content
26.4.1	23E254	April 8, 2026	
26.4.2	23E261	April 22, 2026	Security content
26.5	23F77	May 11, 2026	Developer release notes Release notes: Pride Luminance, a dynamic new wallpaper that refracts light when a user interacts with their device; Screen Time now alerts and contacts parents when code overrides are used; Buy with iPhone now authorizes third-party TV app marketplace transactions; Satellite support now grants carrier messaging connectivity for iPhone 13; Vision Pro app fix restores functionality to app rendering errors
26.5.1	23F81	June 1, 2026	iPhones 17, 17e, 17 Pro, 17 Pro Max and Air only Release notes: Fixes an issue where devices fail to charge if completely drained; Corrects a bug causing home screen background desaturation; Delivers crucial security updates and smoother ProMotion scrolling
26.5.2	23F84	June 29, 2026	
26.6	23G71	July 27, 2026	Security content, optimizes the Spotlight index to prepare for iOS 27.
26.6.1	23G83	August 17, 2026	
26.6.2	23G90	September 8, 2026	
26.7	23H24	September 14, 2026	OTA only; All iPhones that support iOS 26 also support iOS 27.
26.7.1	23H30	September 28, 2026	OTA only; All iPhones that support iOS 26 also support iOS 27.
26.7.2	23H128	October 26, 2026	OTA only; All iPhones that support iOS 26 also support iOS 27.
26.7.3	23H131	November 9, 2026	OTA only; All iPhones that support iOS 26 also support iOS 27.
Legend: Unsupported Latest version Preview version
