= IPhone SE (3rd generation) =

Smartphone by Apple

iPhone SE

- The third-generation iPhone SE
- Developer: Apple
- Manufacturer: Foxconn
- Type: Smartphone
- Series: iPhone
- First released: March 18, 2022; 4 years ago
- Availability by region: March 18, 2022: Australia; Austria; Belgium; Canada; China; Czech Republic; Denmark; Egypt; Finland; France; Germany; Hong Kong; Hungary; Ireland; India; Italy; Japan; Luxembourg; Netherlands; New Zealand; Norway; Poland; Portugal; Saudi Arabia; Singapore; Sweden; Switzerland; Taiwan; United Arab Emirates; United Kingdom; United States; March 25, 2022: Bahrain; Kuwait; Malaysia; Oman; Qatar; South Korea; Thailand; Turkey; April 4, 2022: Mexico; Brazil; April 9, 2022: Vietnam; April 13, 2022: Philippines; June 17, 2022: Indonesia
- Discontinued: February 19, 2025; 20 months ago
- Predecessor: iPhone SE (2nd generation)
- Successor: iPhone 16e
- Compatible networks: GSM, CDMA, 3G, EVDO, HSPA+, 4G LTE, 5G NR
- Form factor: Slate
- Colors: Midnight; (PRODUCT)Red; Starlight
- Dimensions: 138.4 × 67.3 × 7.3 mm (5.45 × 2.65 × 0.29 in)
- Weight: 144 g (5.1 oz)
- Operating system: Original: iOS 15.4; Current: iOS 27.2.1, released November 9, 2026
- System-on-chip: Apple A15 Bionic
- Modem: Qualcomm X57 5G
- Memory: 4 GB LPDDR4X RAM
- Storage: 64, 128, or 256 GB NVMe
- SIM: Nano-SIM and eSIM
- Battery: 3.88 V 7.82 W⋅h (2018 mA⋅h) Built-in rechargeable non-removable Lithium‑ion battery
- Charging: Lightning connector (fast-charge capable up to 18 W), or Qi wireless charging
- Rear camera: 12 MP, f/1.8 (wide), PDAF, OIS; Quad-LED dual-tone flash, HDR, panorama; 4K@24/25/30/60 fps, 1080p@25/30/60/120/240 fps, HDR, OIS, stereo sound rec.
- Front camera: 7 MP, f/2.2; 1080p@30/120 fps; gyro-EIS, HDR
- Display: 4.7 in (120 mm) True Tone Retina HD display with IPS technology, 1334 × 750 pixel resolution (326 ppi), 1400:1 contrast ratio (typical), 625 nits max brightness (typical), with dual-ion exchange-strengthened glass and Haptic Touch
- Sound: Stereo speakers
- Connectivity: Near-field communication (NFC), Lightning connector, Bluetooth 5.0, Wi-Fi 6 (802.11ax), Voice over LTE (VoLTE), Wi‑Fi calling, GPS, GNSS, Express Cards with power reserve
- Data inputs: Multi-touch screen; Apple 8-pin Lightning; Touch ID fingerprint scanner; Accelerometer; Proximity sensor; Gyroscope; Compass; Barometer
- Water resistance: IP67 dust/water resistant (up to 1m for 30 minutes)
- Hearing aid compatibility: M3, T4
- Other: FaceTime Audio / Video
- Website: iPhone SE - Apple at the Wayback Machine (archived February 18, 2025)

The third-generation iPhone SE (also known as the iPhone SE 3 or the iPhone SE 2022) is a smartphone designed and developed by Apple. It is part of the 15th generation of the iPhone, alongside the iPhone 13 and 13 Mini and iPhone 13 Pro and 13 Pro Max models. Apple announced the third-generation iPhone SE on March 8, 2022, as the successor to the second-generation iPhone SE of 2020. Pre-orders began on March 11, 2022, and the phone was released afterwards on March 18, 2022.

Critics generally praised the A15 Bionic processor of the third-generation iPhone SE for giving it speed as well as computational photography, as well as its accessible launch price. Some reviewers and consumers also liked the return of the home button with Touch ID. Negativity was mostly aimed at its "outdated" design and apparent poor battery life.

The third-generation iPhone SE was discontinued on February 19, 2025 following the release of the iPhone 16e.

== Overview ==
The third-generation iPhone SE was announced alongside the iPad Air (5th generation), the Mac Studio with a M1 Ultra chip, and a Green color option for the iPhone 13 series at Apple's “Peek Performance” on March 8, 2022. Pre-orders began on March 11, 2022, and the phone was released afterwards on March 18, 2022. It was released with a starting price of US$429, a $30 increase over its predecessor.

Externally, the third-generation iPhone SE, just like the second-generation iPhone SE but unlike the first-generation iPhone SE, has the same dimensions and form factor as the iPhone 8, with a similar design. Internally, the third-generation iPhone SE has similar hardware components to the iPhone 13 series, including the A15 Bionic system-on-chip and 5G connectivity. The third-generation iPhone SE is the last iPhone to feature 4 GB of RAM, as well as 64 GB of internal storage, a home button with Touch ID, and an LCD screen.

== Design ==
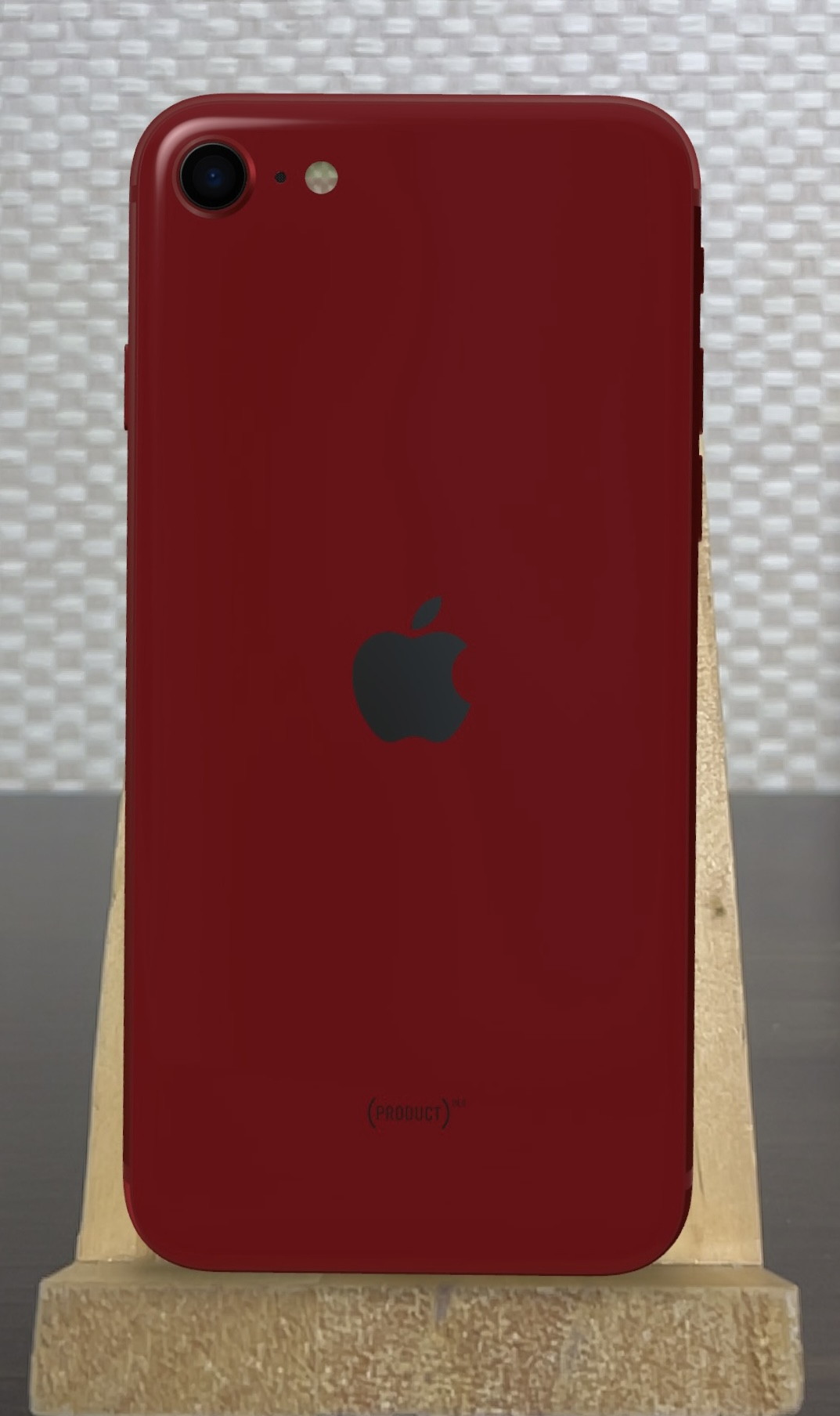
Back of the iPhone SE (3rd generation, in (PRODUCT) Red)

The iPhone SE features an aluminum frame, paired with a glass front and back. It also shares the same physical sizes and dimensions as the iPhone 8 and is externally identical, except for a centered Apple logo and the removal of the iPhone branding in the lower midsection.

The iPhone SE is available in three colors: Midnight, Starlight, and a Product Red edition. Midnight and Starlight replace Black and White respectively. The Product Red color is darker than it was on the predecessor. The colors correspond to those of the iPhone 13.

It is the final entry-level iPhone to retain the Product Red edition color option since the launch of the iPhone 16e on February 28, 2025.

Color	Name	Bezel
	Midnight	Black
	Starlight	Black
	Product Red	Black

== Specifications ==
=== Hardware ===
The iPhone SE incorporates the Apple A15 Bionic system on a chip (SoC), with an integrated motion coprocessor and fifth-generation Neural Engine. It is available in three internal storage configurations: 64 GB, 128 GB, and 256 GB. It has 4 GB of RAM, an increase over the second-generation model's 3 GB of RAM. The third-generation iPhone SE has the same IP67 rating for dust and water resistance as its predecessor. The phone lacks the ultra-wideband features enabled by the U1 chip found in the iPhone 13 and 13 Pro. Despite the phone's smaller size, which may lead to increased thermal throttling, the SE's A15 SoC runs at the same peak CPU frequencies as the iPhone 13. Like its predecessor, the third-generation iPhone SE does not feature a standard 3.5 mm stereo headphone jack and keeps a home button.

==== Display ====
The iPhone SE 3 features the same HD Retina display found on its predecessor, using IPS technology with True Tone and wide color gamut (Display P3). The display has a resolution of, 1334 × 750 pixels, like the previous 4.7 in (120 mm) iPhones. The pixel density is 326 PPI, the same as on all iPhones with LCDs since the introduction of the Retina display on the iPhone 4, excluding the Plus models. It can play HDR10 and Dolby Vision content despite not having an HDR-ready display, done by down-converting the HDR content to fit the display while still having some enhancements to dynamic range, contrast, and wide color gamut compared to standard content.

==== Camera ====
The iPhone SE has a rear 12 MP camera with a single lens, similar to the single lens camera system of its predecessor, capable of recording 4K video at 24, 25, 30, or 60 fps, 1080p HD video at 25, 30 or 60 fps, or 720p HD video at 30 fps. The camera has an aperture of ƒ/1.8, autofocus, optical image stabilization, and a quad-LED True Tone flash. The phone can also take panoramas up to 63 MP, and shoot photos in burst mode. The front camera is 7 MP with an aperture of f/2.2 and autofocus, capable of shooting 1080p HD video at 25 or 30 fps and slow-motion video at 120 fps.

The third-generation SE adds several camera functions enabled by the A15 Bionic. Like the 13 and 13 Pro, the rear camera supports Smart HDR 4. The rear camera also supports extended dynamic range video up to 30 fps, stereo recording and cinematic video stabilization. Both the front and rear cameras of the iPhone SE support Portrait mode and Portrait Lighting. The SE's implementation of Portrait mode only natively supports images of humans, as the hardware does not produce depth maps through the use of focus pixels and instead relies on software-based machine learning. Like the 13 and 13 Pro, Portrait mode has depth control and an advanced bokeh effect (blurring effect of the out-of-focus background around the portrait). The third-generation SE supports Deep Fusion and Photographic Styles, but lacks support for some features such as Night Mode and Cinematic mode due to older sensor hardware.

==== Battery ====
The third generation of the iPhone SE features a 2,018 mA⋅h battery, up from 1,821 mA⋅h on its predecessor. According to Apple, this enables an offline video playback time of 15 hours, up from 13 hours. This brings it up to par with the older but more expensive iPhone 12 Mini.

=== Software ===
The iPhone SE (3rd generation) was originally supplied with iOS 15.4 at release, and was eligible to update to iOS 16 beginning in September 2022. The latest version of iOS compatible with the third-generation iPhone SE, as of September 2026, is iOS 27.

The navigation gestures are the same as they were on iPhone models prior to the iPhone X.

== Discontinuation ==
To comply with European Union mandates, the iPhone SE (3rd generation), as well as all the iPhone 14 models, were discontinued in the European Union (as well as Switzerland and Northern Ireland) on December 28, 2024, and the rest of the world on February 19, 2025, completing the iPhone's transition from the Lightning connector to USB-C, and was not discontinued in September with the release of a newer iPhone generation.

== Reception ==
PCMag described the third-generation iPhone SE as "a solid entry-level iPhone for people who don't need the latest thing", praising its compact frame, battery life and performance while criticizing its network performance and lack of a camera Night mode.

Preceded by iPhone SE (2nd)	iPhone e/SE; 15th generation	Succeeded by iPhone 16e
