= I26 =

- Japanese submarine I-26
- I iPhone operating system
