= IOS 27 =

2026 mobile operating system by Apple

iOS 27
- Version of the iOS operating system

- iOS 27 home screen on an iPhone 17 Pro
- Developer: Apple
- Written in: C; C++; Objective-C; Swift; assembly language
- OS family: iOS
- Source model: Closed with open-source components
- General availability: September 14, 2026; 2 months ago
- Latest release: 27.2.1 (November 9, 2026; 12 days ago) [±]
- Latest preview: 27.3 beta 2 v2 (November 19, 2026; 2 days ago) [±]
- Available in
- Supported platforms: iPhone
- Preceded by: iOS 26
- Official website: apple.com/os/ios
- Tagline: All glowed up.

Support status
- Supported

Articles in the series

iOS 27 is the twentieth and current major release of iOS, Apple's mobile operating system for the iPhone. Succeeding iOS 26, it was announced on June 8, 2026, at the Worldwide Developers Conference (WWDC), alongside iPadOS 27, macOS Golden Gate, watchOS 27, visionOS 27, and tvOS 27, and became publicly available on September 14, 2026.

== Features ==
=== System features ===
==== Apple Intelligence ====
iOS 27 expands Apple Intelligence, Apple's generative AI system, with improved writing tools and the ability to generate images with a private cloud model. Resource-heavy features, such as image generation, have daily limits. Higher usage of these features is available to paid iCloud+ subscribers, excluding users of the 50 GB tier. Advanced capabilities, like custom Siri voices, are restricted to the iPhone 17 Pro and newer, iPhone Air, and iPhone Duo.

Apple Intelligence–powered camera features in the Home app require an iCloud+ plan with at least a 2 TB tier.

==== Siri AI ====
One core feature of the update is Siri AI, a rebuilt version of Siri powered by Apple Intelligence. The new Siri uses generative AI technology and behaves more like a chatbot. Apple developed the underlying models with Google, and these run on Apple's private cloud computing infrastructure. The new Siri can have natural conversations, use personal information from apps such as Messages, and understand content displayed on screen. Additionally, Siri can carry out complex actions within apps, such as adding events to Calendar or adding photographs to an album.

As part of the changes, Siri is integrated into the Dynamic Island. Swiping down from the center of the screen opens a "Search or Ask" interface that replaces Spotlight. Due to this, the Notification Center is now reached by swiping down from the upper-left corner.

Writing tools are built into Siri, allowing text to be generated, rewritten, or proofread from a systemwide interface rather than a separate panel.

iOS 27 introduces a Siri app that syncs via iCloud. It lets users begin, view, or continue Siri conversations.

Siri AI will not be available at launch in the European Union or China while Apple works through regulatory requirements.

==== AirPods ====
The AirPods settings UI has been updated for iOS 27. iOS 27 has also brought a custom equalizer to AirPods, natively allowing for manual adjustment of audio frequencies.

==== Parental controls ====
iOS 27 introduces a redesigned Screen Time interface and new child-safety controls. Parents can set time allowances across app categories such as entertainment, games, and social media. Furthermore, parents can determine which apps are available at different times of day, with recommendations based on a child's age and guidance from experts. An "Ask to Browse" feature requires children to obtain approval before visiting a new website. Similarly, parents can require approval before a child communicates with a new contact in Messages, FaceTime, or by phone.

==== Accessibility ====
Live Recognition uses the iPhone's camera and on-device models to identify and describe people, objects, and surroundings in real time, and can answer follow-up questions about what it sees; it is invoked using the Action button. VoiceOver adds Image Explorer, which produces richer descriptions of photos, documents, and other visual content. Voice Control allows users to describe onscreen buttons and controls rather than recalling exact labels, and Accessibility Reader handles more complex source material, including summaries and translation.

==== CarPlay ====
CarPlay adds a persistent mini player in the top corner of audio and media apps, showing artwork and playback controls while the user browses elsewhere in the app. Audio scrubbing is supported for the first time, with an enlarged playhead for navigating within songs, podcasts, and audiobooks. Navigation apps can share route data with a vehicle so that a route can be checked against the vehicle's range and a charging stop suggested. CarPlay also receives new wallpapers, larger interactive content thumbnails, and updated Liquid Glass app icons.

==== Other system changes ====
A new battery icon was introduced with iOS 27. Apple revised the Liquid Glass design introduced in iOS 26 to improve readability. A Liquid Glass slider in the settings allows users to adjust its translucency. Additionally, app icons were redesigned to allow more layers of Liquid Glass in them. Apple also described general performance and responsiveness improvements across the system. Apple introduced iPhone Handoff, which allows users to switch between two iPhones while using the same phone number.

For devices sold in China, the overwrite storage feature was introduced with iOS 27.2, due to Chinese mandatory standard GB 46864-2025. Users can overwrite the device's entire mass storage, erasing all data. The iOS 27.2 beta 2 build introduced the Restrict Motion Data control for devices signed in with Chinese Apple Accounts, reducing apps' ability to trigger shake-to-open advertisements.

=== App features ===
==== Camera and Photos ====
Visual Intelligence was moved into the Camera app as a new Siri mode. Through it, users can photograph objects to get information from Siri, look up the nutritional value of food, import multiple events into Calendar at once, split a receipt, import contact details from a business card, or add a membership card to the Wallet app.

The Photos app gains AI editing tools. The cleanup feature is better at removing objects and filling in missing areas, while new reframe and extend options use AI to change a photo's composition or enlarge its crop with newly generated content. Other additions include a "Captured by Me" collection, support for keywords and star ratings, the ability to save a video frame as a still photo, and slideshows for any set of images. iCloud Shared Albums add full-resolution sharing, a 30-day expiration option, and the ability for users on Android and Windows devices to contribute images.

==== Safari and Passwords ====
Safari uses Apple Intelligence to organize open tabs, bookmarks, and the Reading List into related topics. Users can generate custom extensions by typing out natural language, and "Notify Me" monitors a webpage to alert the user when it changes. The Passwords app can use AI to visit a website on its own, sign in, and replace a vulnerable password with a stronger one.

Apple has said Safari is more power efficient than in the previous release.

==== Wallet ====
Apple Wallet adds "Create a Pass", a feature that uses Visual Intelligence to generate a digital pass for tickets, memberships, and similar items from services that do not support Wallet. A bill-splitting feature uses Apple Cash to divide the cost of a scanned receipt among several people.

A new "Insights" feature displays spendings on different connected accounts, detailing highlights and trends. This feature is only available in the UK.

==== Phone, FaceTime, and Messages ====
The Phone application adds call context, which brings up relevant information during a call, such as a flight number when calling an airline. FaceTime gains a dual capture option that streams the front and rear cameras simultaneously. In Messages, sending large photos and videos no longer delays accompanying text messages. Additionally, outgoing messages show a send indicator, tapback notifications are consolidated, and Apple Intelligence suggests actions such as adding a photo or sharing a location.

==== Maps and Find My ====
Apple Maps uses aerial imagery and Vision Intelligence models to produce a more detailed Flyover experience. Find My allows for customized location sharing, letting users share their location for a custom duration or until a set time. The new hide location option lets a user stop sharing their location with a specific person without notifying that person. The Find My interface was also refreshed with the Liquid Glass design.

==== Other apps ====
Image Playground was overhauled to generate images in any style, including photorealistic results. It now allows for edits through text descriptions or touch gestures. Image Playground images include Google's Synth ID to identify them as AI-generated. Genmoji creation was made faster and higher quality, along with a "Describe a Change" button. The Music app introduces redesigned artist pages, varied AutoMix transitions between songs, and folders for organizing playlists. The Calendar and Reminders apps support natural language for managing events and tasks. The Shortcuts app can create a shortcut from natural language. The Clock app allows the alarm volume to be set independently of the system volume. In the Health and Fitness apps, GymKit support was extended to the iPhone (and AirPods) for pairing with gym equipment. Furthermore, route maps and treadmill distances are more accurate, step counts sync between both apps, and cycle tracking adds support for perimenopause and menopause. The Journal app now includes generative writing prompts for inspiration. The Notes app adds Markdown support, converting pasted Markdown to rich text and allowing note content to be exported as raw Markdown, along with native divider lines and a "Write with Siri" button.

In mainland China, the Clock app can automatically adjust weekday alarms to account for statutory public holidays and the country's weekend shifting scheme, where weekend days and adjacent weekdays are subject to non-routine adjustments to create longer consecutive holiday periods.

== Supported devices ==
iOS 27 requires an iPhone with the Apple A13 Bionic chip or newer, thus retaining support for all iPhones that support iOS 26. Apple Intelligence features require the A17 Pro chip or newer, as found on the iPhone 15 Pro or newer. Even though devices may support Apple Intelligence, features such as custom Siri voices require the A19 Pro chip or newer, found in the iPhone Air, iPhone 17 Pro and newer, and iPhone Duo.

| Supported device | Chipset | RAM | Apple Intelligence support | Improved Apple Intelligence model |
|---|---|---|---|---|
| iPhone 11 | A13 | 4 GB | No | No |
| iPhone 11 Pro & 11 Pro Max | A13 | 4 GB | No | No |
| iPhone SE (2nd generation) | A13 | 3 GB | No | No |
| iPhone 12 & 12 Mini | A14 | 4 GB | No | No |
| iPhone 12 Pro & 12 Pro Max | A14 | 6 GB | No | No |
| iPhone 13 & 13 Mini | A15 | 4 GB | No | No |
| iPhone 13 Pro & 13 Pro Max | A15 | 6 GB | No | No |
| iPhone SE (3rd generation) | A15 | 4 GB | No | No |
| iPhone 14 & 14 Plus | A15 | 6 GB | No | No |
| iPhone 14 Pro & 14 Pro Max | A16 | 6 GB | No | No |
| iPhone 15 & 15 Plus | A16 | 6 GB | No | No |
| iPhone 15 Pro & 15 Pro Max | A17 Pro | 8 GB | Yes | No |
| iPhone 16 & 16 Plus | A18 | 8 GB | Yes | No |
| iPhone 16 Pro & 16 Pro Max | A18 Pro | 8 GB | Yes | No |
| iPhone 16e | A18 | 8 GB | Yes | No |
| iPhone 17 | A19 | 8 GB | Yes | No |
| iPhone 17 Pro & 17 Pro Max | A19 Pro | 12 GB | Yes | Yes |
| iPhone Air | A19 Pro | 12 GB | Yes | Yes |
| iPhone 17e | A19 | 8 GB | Yes | No |
| iPhone 18 Pro & 18 Pro Max | A20 Pro | 12 GB | Yes | Yes |
| iPhone Duo | A20 Pro | 12 GB | Yes | Yes |

== Version history ==
iOS 27 version history
| Version | Build number | Release date | Notes |
|---|---|---|---|
| 27.0 | 24A427 | September 18, 2026 | Preinstalled on iPhone 18 Pro and 18 Pro Max |
| 27.0 | 24A8428 | September 18, 2026 | Preinstalled on iPhone 18 Pro and 18 Pro Max |
| 27.0 | 24A437 | September 14, 2026 | |
| 27.0.1 | 24A446 | September 28, 2026 | |
| 27.1 | 24A94232 | October 23, 2026 | Preinstalled on iPhone Duo |
| 27.1 | 24A94425 | October 12, 2026 | Day 1 update for iPhone Duo |
| 27.2 | 24B119 | October 26, 2026 | |
| 27.2 | 24B120 | October 26, 2026 | iPhone 11 only |
| 27.2 | 24B91020 | October 26, 2026 | iPhone Duo only |
| 27.2.1 | 24B156 | November 9, 2026 | Adds HomeView pairing support |
| 27.2.1 | 24B91034 | November 9, 2026 | iPhone Duo only |
| 27.3 beta 2 v2 | 24C5049f | November 19, 2026 | |
Legend: Unsupported Latest version Preview version Future version
