= IPhone 17e =

2026 smartphone by Apple

iPhone 17e

- iPhone 17e in Soft Pink
- Brand: Apple
- Manufacturer: Foxconn
- Type: Smartphone
- Series: iPhone
- First released: March 11, 2026; 7 months ago
- Predecessor: iPhone 16e
- Related: iPhone 17 iPhone 17 Pro iPhone Air
- Compatible networks: 2G / 3G / 4G LTE / 5G NR / 5G-A
- Form factor: Slate
- Colors: Soft Pink; White; Black
- Dimensions: 146.7 × 71.5 × 7.8 mm (5.78 × 2.81 × 0.31 in)
- Weight: 169 g (6.0 oz)
- Operating system: Original: iOS 26.3; Current: iOS 27.2.1, released November 9, 2026
- System-on-chip: Apple A19
- Modem: Apple C1X
- Memory: 8 GB
- Storage: 256 or 512 GB
- SIM: Dual eSIM: United States, Canada, Mexico, Bahrain, Kuwait, Oman, Qatar, Saudi Arabia, United Arab Emirates, Japan; nano-SIM and eSIM: elsewhere
- Battery: 15.556 Wh (4005 mAh) @ 3.884 V lithium-ion
- Charging: Fast charging 30 W Wireless MagSafe charging 25 W
- Rear camera: 48 MP, f/1.6, 26 mm
- Front camera: 12 MP, f/1.9, 20 mm
- Display: 6.1 in (155 mm) 2532 × 1170, 460 ppi, Super Retina XDR OLED, HDR10, 1200 nits
- Sound: Stereo speakers
- Connectivity: Wi-Fi 6 (802.11a/b/g/n/ac/ax) dual-band; Bluetooth 5.3 (A2DP, LE)
- Data inputs: List of inputs: Multi-touch screen; 3 microphones; Motion coprocessor; 3-axis gyroscope; 3-axis accelerometer; iBeacon; Barometer; Digital compass; Proximity sensor; Ambient light sensor; Face ID
- Water resistance: IP68 dust tight and water resistant (immersible up to 6 m for 30 min)
- Made in: China, India
- Other: Emergency SOS, Messages and Find My via satellite, Action Button, FaceTime Audio or Video at 1080p over Wi-Fi and 5G, Voice over 5G Standalone
- Website: apple.com/iphone-17e

The iPhone 17e is a smartphone developed and marketed by Apple as part of the iPhone product line. It was announced on March 2, 2026, and positioned as the entry-level model within the iPhone 17 lineup. At launch, like the iPhone 16e, it had a starting price of US$599, but with 256 GB of storage as opposed to 128 GB. It was later raised to US$699 on September 9, 2026.

The iPhone 17e features an edge-to-edge display with a thinner notch (as seen on iPhone 14) instead of the Dynamic Island (introduced with iPhone 14 Pro). It features Face ID and a USB-C port. The iPhone 17e shares its dimensions and front design with the iPhone 13, iPhone 13 Pro, and the iPhone 14. The iPhone 17e has support for Qi2 and MagSafe wireless charging, unlike the iPhone 16e.

The iPhone 17e is powered by the A19 SoC (reduced to 4 GPU cores). Other features include one 48 MP Fusion camera with optical zoom up to 2x, a custom Apple C1X cellular modem, and support for Apple Intelligence.

== History ==
On March 2, Apple announced the iPhone 17e with the release date for March 11, 2026.

Apple started taking pre-orders on March 4, 2026, with general availability on March 11, 2026.

== Design ==
The iPhone 17e features an aluminium frame accompanied by a glass front and matte finished back glass featuring a ceramic protective coating. It also shares the same physical sizes and dimensions as the iPhone 13, iPhone 13 Pro, iPhone 14, and iPhone 16e. It also has the Action Button but omits the Camera Control.

The iPhone 17e is available in three colors: the new Soft Pink, White, and Black.

| Color | Name |
|---|---|
| | Soft Pink |
| | White |
| | Black |

== Specifications ==
=== Hardware ===
The iPhone 17e incorporates the Apple A19 system on a chip with a binned, four-core GPU, available in two internal storage configurations: 256 GB and 512 GB. It has 8 GB of RAM, the same as the previous generation. The iPhone 17e also has an IP68 rating for dust and water resistance.

Apple claims the iPhone 17e offers up to 26 hours of offline video playback, and up to 21 hours of streamed video playback. It can get up to 50% charge in 30 minutes. The iPhone 17e supports MagSafe for up to 15 W of wireless charging speeds with MagSafe chargers, and added support for Qi2 wireless charging, while the previous iPhone 16e is incompatible with both.

To lower production costs, Apple used binned A19 chips retained from iPhone 17 production. On these chips, one of the five GPU cores was defective and had been rejected during manufacturing. With that core disabled, the chips were configured as four-core GPUs for use in the iPhone 17e. Because Apple had already paid for the chips during iPhone 17 production, they carried no additional procurement cost.

iPhone 17e uses Apple's in-house C1X cellular modem, which offers faster speeds, better reception strength, and improved efficiency, compared to the Apple C1 modem found in iPhone 16e.

The iPhone 17e does not include the Apple-designed N1 wireless chip found in the rest of the iPhone 17 lineup. As a result, the iPhone 17e is limited to Wi-Fi 6 rather than Wi-Fi 7.

The iPhone 17e features the new Ceramic Shield 2 on the front, which Apple claims to be able to provide three times better scratch resistance than the previous generation. The Ceramic Shield 2 is present on the front of all iPhone 17 models.

=== Display ===
The iPhone 17e features a Super Retina XDR display, using an OLED panel. The display has a resolution of 2532 × 1170 pixels, with a diagonal size of 6.1 in (150 mm) and a pixel density of 460 PPI. It offers 800 nits of typical brightness and up to 1200 nits of peak HDR brightness. It can also play HDR10 and Dolby Vision content. The display panel is identical to the one found on the iPhone 13, iPhone 14, and iPhone 16e, which all feature the notch design. The display of iPhone 17e has True Tone functionality and it uses the P3 wide color gamut.

Additionally, the display of iPhone 17e comes with an anti-reflective coating, also found on all models of the iPhone 17 series.

=== Camera ===
The iPhone 17e has a 2-in-1 rear 48 MP Fusion camera with a single lens. It has optical-quality zoom up to 2x, by cropping a portion of the sensor. It is capable of recording 4k video at 24, 25, 30, or 60 fps, 1080p HD video at 25, 30 or 60 fps, or 720p HD video at 30 fps. The camera has an aperture of f/1.6, autofocus, lens-shifted optical image stabilization, and a dual-LED True Tone flash. The front camera is a 12 MP TrueDepth module with an aperture of f/1.9 and autofocus, capable of shooting 4k video at 25, 30 or 60 fps and slow-motion video at 120 fps. The rear camera supports Smart HDR 5, spatial audio recording, wind noise reduction, audio zoom and audio mix. Both the front and rear cameras of the iPhone 17e support Portrait mode and Portrait Lighting. Portrait mode has depth control and an advanced bokeh effect (blurring effect of the out-of-focus background around the portrait). The iPhone 17e supports Photonic Engine, Deep Fusion, Photographic Styles, and Night Mode but lacks Cinematic Mode and Action Mode. The camera system of iPhone 17e remains unchanged overall, when compared to its predecessor, the iPhone 16e.

The 12 MP front camera system of the iPhone 17e is identical to its predecessor, omitting the new features found on every other iPhone 17 model, such as Center Stage, Dual Capture, ultra-stabilized video, and automatic group selfie expansion.

=== Software ===
The iPhone 17e was shipped with iOS 26.3 on release on March 11, 2026. It also has full Support for iOS 27, which released on September 14, 2026.

Like the iPhone 15 Pro and all iPhone 16 and iPhone 17 models, the iPhone 17e supports Apple Intelligence.

Like every iPhone model, the iPhone 17e has its own set of exclusive wallpapers with three variants, matching each of the three colors of the device.

== Reception ==
The Guardian's Samuel Gibbs praised the iPhone 17e for its performance, software, storage, and battery life, but criticized its camera, price, and the absence of WiFi 7.

| Preceded by iPhone 16e | iPhone; 19th generation alongside iPhone 17 / Air and iPhone 17 Pro / 17 Pro Max | Succeeded by Most recent |
