= IOS 13 =

2019 mobile operating system

iOS 13
- Version of the iOS operating system

- iOS 13 home screen on an iPhone X
- Developer: Apple
- Working state: No longer supported
- Source model: Closed, with open-source components
- Initial release: September 19, 2019; 7 years ago
- Latest release: 13.7 (17H35) (September 1, 2020; 6 years ago) [±]
- Update method: Software Update
- Package manager: App Store
- Supported platforms: iPhone, iPod Touch, HomePod
- Kernel type: Hybrid (XNU)
- Default user interface: Cocoa Touch (multi-touch, GUI)
- License: Proprietary software with open-source components
- Preceded by: iOS 12
- Succeeded by: iOS 14
- Official website: iOS 13 at the Wayback Machine (archived September 11, 2020)
- Tagline: A whole new look. On a whole new level.

Support status
- Obsolete, unsupported

Articles in the series

iOS 13 is the thirteenth major release of the iOS mobile operating system developed by Apple for the iPhone, iPod Touch and HomePod. The successor to iOS 12, it was announced at the company's Worldwide Developers Conference (WWDC) on June 3, 2019, and released on September 19, 2019. It was succeeded by iOS 14, released on September 16, 2020.

As of iOS 13, the iPad lines run a separate operating system, derived from iOS, named iPadOS. Both iPadOS 13 and iOS 13 drop support for devices with less than 2 GB of RAM.

== Overview ==
iOS 13 and iPadOS 13 were introduced by Senior Vice President of Software Engineering Craig Federighi at the WWDC keynote address on June 3, 2019.

The first beta was made available to registered developers after the keynote. The second beta was released to registered developers on June 18, 2019, and the first public beta was released on June 24, 2019. The initial release of iOS 13 was version 13.0, which was released to the public on September 19, 2019.

== System features ==
=== Privacy ===
iOS 13 changes how location data is handled. When an app requests access to location, the user can choose to grant access whenever they use the app, never, or only once. The user will receive similar prompts for background location access, and when an app requests access to Bluetooth or Wi-Fi (which may also be used for non-consensual location tracking).

In August 2019, it was reported that beginning in April 2020, the PushKit API for VoIP would be restricted to internet telephone usage, closing a "loophole" that had been used by other apps for background data collection.

=== User interface ===
A system-wide dark mode lets users enable a light-on-dark color scheme across the entire iOS and iPadOS user interface, all native applications, and supported third-party apps. It can be manually turned on or set to automatically switch between light and dark modes based on the time of day.

The volume indicator was redesigned, replacing the larger, centered overlay with a slimmer bar displayed vertically near the volume keys in portrait orientation, or at the top in landscape orientation. The bar can also be manipulated directly.

The card UI elements from Apple Music, Apple Podcasts, and Apple Books have been implemented system-wide and are available for third parties to use in their apps.

=== Siri ===
Siri uses a software-generated voice called "Neural TTS", intended to sound more natural than previous versions that use clips of human voices. Siri also became more functional, and new sound control is available. The Siri Shortcuts app is installed by default. Siri also uses HomePod to learn and recognize voices of different people. It is also possible for Siri to automatically read incoming messages aloud on AirPods.

=== Keyboard ===
The QuickType virtual keyboard features QuickPath, allowing the user to swipe their finger across the keyboard to complete words and phrases. This functionality was previously exclusively available via third-party keyboard applications such as SwiftKey, Adaptxt, Gboard, or Swype. Emoji stickers have been included on the emoji keyboard and can be used wherever regular emoji can be.

=== Text editing ===
iOS 13 and iPadOS 13 add a new system-wide gesture interface for cut, copy, paste, undo, and redo. A three-finger swipe left or up will undo; three fingers right or down will redo. A single three-finger pinch will copy, a second three-finger pinch will cut, and a three-finger spread pastes. A three-finger single tap will bring up a shortcut menu with all five options.

The blue text cursor can be moved around text fields by pressing and holding to pick it up and move it. Many new options for text selection have also been added: double-tapping a word will select it, triple-tapping selects a sentence, and quadruple-tapping a paragraph selects it.

=== Sign in with Apple ===
A new single sign-on service known as "Sign in with Apple" is integrated with iOS 13, and allows users to create accounts for third-party services with a minimal amount of personal information. Users may optionally generate a disposable email address for each account, improving privacy and anonymity, and reducing the amount of information that can be associated with a single email address.

All iOS applications that support third-party social login are required to implement Sign in with Apple, The iOS human interface guidelines also state that Sign in with Apple should be given prominence above any other login provider in application interfaces.

=== Performance ===
iOS 13 contains several performance improvements. Face ID unlocks the iPhone X, XS/ XS Max, and XR up to 30% faster than on iOS 12. A new file format makes app downloads as much as 50% smaller, app updates as much as 60% smaller, and app launches up to twice as fast.

=== Battery lifespan extender ===
Similar to many laptops, iOS 13 has a feature to limit the battery charging percentage to 80%.

Keeping the battery percentage more centered instead of complete charges and discharges reduces strain onto the battery. This reduces the battery aging of the lithium-ion battery and extends its lifespan.

=== Haptics ===
iOS 13 introduced a new Core Haptics framework. Prior to iOS 13, apps could only provide the default haptic patterns. Core Haptics gives developers more fine-grained control over the iPhone's Taptic Engine, including synchronized audio, allowing apps to provide customized haptic and audio feedback. This feature is only available on iPhone 8 or newer. It is also not supported on the iPod Touch due to the lack of a haptic motor in those devices.

=== External storage ===
iOS 13 introduced the ability to use external USB drives in Files. Previously external storage was supported in Photos. Although primarily designed for thumb drives and hard drives, a wide variety of USB disk devices will work, thanks to the iOS's support of the SCSI subclass of USB Mass Storage. Native SCSI disk devices will work as well, when used with a SCSI to USB adapter.

=== Exposure Notification API ===
On May 20, 2020, Apple released iOS 13.5, which includes the Exposure Notification API that provides access to the (Google/Apple) Exposure Notification System that Apple have developed jointly with Google. This is provided to support digital contact tracing which came to light during the COVID-19 pandemic.

=== ARKit 3 ===
ARKit 3 was released as a part of iOS 13 and brought new features, such as People occlusion, which allowed AR objects to be in front or behind people in a more realistic way. New features were restricted to devices with A12 processors and newer – like iPhone XS, iPhone XR, and the 2018 iPad Pro. Other features of ARKit 3 were multiple face tracking and collaborative sessions.

=== ARKit 3.5 ===
Released with the 2020 iPad Pro, ARKit 3.5 vastly improved positioning in virtual environments due to new anchors and use of data from a LiDAR scanner. It also improved its motion capture and people occlusion.

=== Other changes ===
The version of iOS for iPad devices was renamed iPadOS, reflecting the precedence for the OS to include additional features intended primarily for use on tablets.

iOS 13 adds official support for the Sony DualShock 4 and the Microsoft Xbox One controller. iOS 13 also adds support for wireless audio sharing for AirPods and certain Beats headphones.

A new multi-select gesture is available in supported applications such as Files and Mail. Multiple items, such as files or emails, can be quickly selected by dragging two fingers over the desired items.

== App features ==
=== Music ===
Apple Music now supports real-time synced song lyrics that animate along with the music as they are being sung, rapped or spoken. The currently playing line is highlighted in white color. The feature also lets the user skip to a part of a song simply by tapping on the lyric.

=== Messages and Memoji ===
User profiles can be created and Memoji can be used as an iMessage profile picture. All iOS devices with an A9 processor or newer can create custom Memoji. Memoji and Animoji can be used as a sticker in iMessage and other apps; they are also available as regular emoji for use anywhere the emoji keyboard is available. There are a variety of new customization options for Memoji.

=== Maps ===
The Maps app features a redesigned maps UI, featuring more detailed maps, and Look Around, a street level imagery implementation similar to Google Street View.

=== Reminders ===
Redesigned and rebuilt from the ground up with new features such as the ability to suggest when a reminder should be delivered to the user, and the ability to tag contacts so that references to reminders can be surfaced elsewhere, such as in Messages.

=== Photos ===
The Photos app includes a redesigned UI and uses machine learning to auto-hide "clutter" images such as screenshots and documents.

Photos has a redesigned interface showing users photos they took in the past year, month, week and day. This brings all photos to one page and shows users photos based on what their device suggests for them.

== Problems ==
There were a number of issues following the release of iOS 13, some relating to battery drain, call-dropping, and ringtones not functioning properly, resulting in frequent software updates and patches. Despite the frequency of bug fix releases, the updates have introduced new issues.

Other issues included incorrect artwork for user's playlists. Users reported the artwork is repeated for some playlists or uses a different picture.

== Supported devices ==
iOS 13 requires 2 GB of RAM. It drops support for all iPhones and iPod Touches using an Apple A7 or A8 SoC and devices that shipped with 1 GB of RAM. (Note: iPhone 5s, 6, 6 Plus, iPod Touch (6th generation)) iOS 13 is the first version of iOS to drop support for iPhones with Touch ID.

To further differentiate features between iPhones and iPads, Apple rebranded the tablet-oriented platform with its own operating system, iPadOS.

=== iPhone ===
- iPhone 6s & 6s Plus
- iPhone SE (1st generation)
- iPhone 7 & 7 Plus
- iPhone 8 & 8 Plus
- iPhone X
- iPhone XS & XS Max
- iPhone XR
- iPhone 11
- iPhone 11 Pro & 11 Pro Max
- iPhone SE (2nd generation)

=== iPod Touch ===
- iPod Touch (7th generation)

== Version history ==
iOS 13 releases
Version	Build	Codename	Release date	Release notes
13.0 (Note: Initial release for iPhone 11 lineup)	17A577	YukonPre	September 19, 2019	Release notes Security content
13.1 (Note: Initial release for HomePod)	17A844	Yukon	September 24, 2019	Release notes Security content
13.1.1	17A854	Yukon	September 27, 2019	Release notes Security content
13.1.2	17A860 17A861 (Note: iPhone X, iPhone XS, iPhone XS Max only)	Yukon	September 30, 2019	Release notes
13.1.3	17A878	Yukon	October 15, 2019	Release notes
13.2	17B84	YukonB	October 28, 2019	Release notes Security content
13.2.1 (Note: Only available on HomePod)	17B90	YukonB	October 30, 2019	
13.2.2	17B102	YukonB	November 7, 2019	Release notes
13.2.3	17B111	YukonB	November 18, 2019	Release notes
13.3	17C54	YukonC	December 10, 2019	Release notes Security notes
13.3.1	17D50	YukonD	January 28, 2020	Release notes Security content
13.4	17E255	YukonE	March 24, 2020	Release notes Security content
13.4	17E8255 (Note: Initial release on iPhone SE (2nd generation))	YukonE	April 15, 2020 (Note: A different build of iOS 13.4 (17E8255) was shipped only with the iPhone SE (2nd generation), thus making the theoretical release date the same as the SE (2nd) itself. This build is also unavailable for download.)	Release notes Security content
13.4.1	17E262	YukonE	April 7, 2020	Release notes
13.4.1	17E8258	YukonE	April 23, 2020	Release notes
13.5	17F75	YukonF	May 20, 2020	Release notes Security content
13.5.1	17F80	YukonF	June 1, 2020	Release notes Security content
13.6	17G68	YukonG	July 15, 2020	Release notes Security content
13.6.1	17G80	YukonG	August 12, 2020	Release notes
13.7	17H35	YukonH	September 1, 2020	Release notes

See Apple's main page for iOS 13 release notes, as well as their 2019 and 2020 security update contents.

== Reception ==
iOS 13 was hailed as a massive overhaul that introduced highly requested features, but its launch was criticized for being one of the buggiest in Apple's history.

== See also ==
- iPadOS 13
- macOS Catalina
- tvOS 13
- watchOS 6
- SwiftUI

Preceded by iOS 12	iOS 13; 2019	Succeeded by iOS 14
