= IPhone SE (2nd generation) =

13th-generation smartphone developed by Apple

iPhone SE

- The second-generation iPhone SE
- Developer: Apple
- Manufacturers: Foxconn (on contract); Wistron (on contract) for the Indian market
- Type: Smartphone
- First released: April 24, 2020; 6 years ago
- Discontinued: March 8, 2022; 4 years ago
- Predecessor: iPhone SE (1st generation)
- Successor: iPhone SE (3rd generation)
- Compatible networks: GSM, EDGE, UMTS, HSPA+, DC‑HSDPA, CDMA EV‑DO, FDD‑LTE, TD‑LTE
- Form factor: Slate
- Colors: White; Black; (PRODUCT)Red
- Dimensions: H: 138.4 mm (5.45 in); W: 67.3 mm (2.65 in); D: 7.3 mm (0.29 in)
- Weight: 148 g (5.2 oz)
- Operating system: Original: iOS 13.4; Current: iOS 27.0.1, released September 28, 2026
- System-on-chip: A13 Bionic
- Modem: Dual SIM (nano-SIM and eSIM), Gigabit-class LTE with 2x2 MIMO and LAA
- Memory: 3 GB of LPDDR4X RAM
- Storage: 64, 128, or 256 GB (256 GB model discontinued since September 14, 2021) NVMe
- SIM: Nano-SIM and eSIM
- Battery: 1821 mAh, 3.82 V Li-ion
- Charging: Lightning connector (fast-charge capable up to 18W), or Qi wireless charging
- Rear camera: 12 MP with six-element lens, ƒ/1.8 aperture, quad-LED "True Tone" flash with Slow Sync, autofocus, IR filter, Burst mode (photography), 4K video recording at 24, 25, 30, or 60 fps; 1080p at 25, 30 or 60 fps; 720p at 30 fps, slow-motion video (1080p at 120 or 240 fps), timelapse with stabilization, panorama, face detection, Smart HDR, digital image stabilization, optical image stabilization, cinematic video stabilization (4K, 1080p, and 720p), Portrait mode and Portrait lighting
- Front camera: 7 MP with QuickTake video, f/2.2 aperture, burst mode, exposure control, face detection, auto-HDR, auto image stabilization, Retina Flash, 1080p HD video recording, cinematic video stabilization (1080p and 720p), Portrait mode and Portrait lighting
- Display: 4.7 in (120 mm) True Tone Retina HD display with IPS technology, 1334 × 750 pixel resolution (326 ppi), 1400:1 contrast ratio (typical), 625 nits max brightness (typical), with dual-ion exchange-strengthened glass and Haptic Touch
- Sound: Stereo speakers
- Connectivity: Near-field communication (NFC), Lightning connector, Bluetooth 5.0, Wi-Fi 6 (802.11ax), Voice over LTE (VoLTE), Wi‑Fi calling, GPS, GNSS, Express Cards with power reserve
- Data inputs: Multi-touch touchscreen display, barometer, motion coprocessor, 3-axis gyroscope, accelerometer, digital compass, proximity sensor, ambient light sensor, Touch ID fingerprint reader, microphone
- Water resistance: IP67 dust/water resistant (up to 1 m for 30 minutes)
- Hearing aid compatibility: M3, T4
- Website: iPhone SE - Apple at the Wayback Machine (archived March 5, 2022)

The second-generation iPhone SE (also known as the iPhone SE 2 or the iPhone SE 2020) is a smartphone developed and marketed by Apple. It is part of the 13th generation of the iPhone, alongside the iPhone 11 and 11 Pro/Pro Max models. Apple announced it on April 15, 2020, coinciding with the discontinuation of the iPhone 8 and 8 Plus. Orders began on April 17, 2020, and the phone was released on April 24, 2020. It was released with a starting price of US$399, and positioned as a budget phone.

Following the pattern of the first iPhone SE (which shares the form factor of the iPhone 5s, with the internal hardware of the iPhone 6s), the second-generation model shares the form factor of the iPhone 8, with internal components from the iPhone 11 lineup. It has components such as the Apple A13 Bionic system-on-chip, which allows the phone to utilize the single wide-angle lens Portrait Mode, as on the iPhone XR. It also features Smart HDR-2 photos, which are marketed as being better than Smart HDR photos on the iPhone XS and iPhone XR.

The second-generation iPhone SE is the last iPhone to feature 3 GB of RAM, as the third-generation iPhone SE and iPhone 13 feature 4 GB of RAM.

The second-generation iPhone SE was discontinued and removed from the official website by Apple on March 8, 2022, following the announcement of its successor, the third-generation iPhone SE.

The iPhone SE (2nd generation) is the longest supported iPhone ever, despite having only 3 GB of RAM, along with the iPhone 11 and 11 Pro, supporting eight major versions of iOS from iOS 13 through iOS 27.

== History ==
A successor to the first-generation iPhone SE had been rumored since 2017, the year after the original was released. The name was also subject to speculation. Guesses included (most prevalently) iPhone SE 2, iPhone SE 2020, and iPhone 9 due to design similarities with the iPhone 8.

In March 2020, cases for the phone were reportedly being supplied to Best Buy, showing an iPhone with an iPhone 8-sized body and a single camera lens. Belkin screen protectors for the iPhone SE were also listed on the online Apple Store, cross-compatible with the base models of the iPhones 6, 6S, 7, and 8. However, references to the iPhone SE were quickly removed.

On April 15, 2020, the second-generation iPhone SE was announced in a press release note on Apple's website. It was marketed as "A powerful new smartphone in a popular design", and was released worldwide on April 24, 2020.

== Specifications ==
=== Design ===
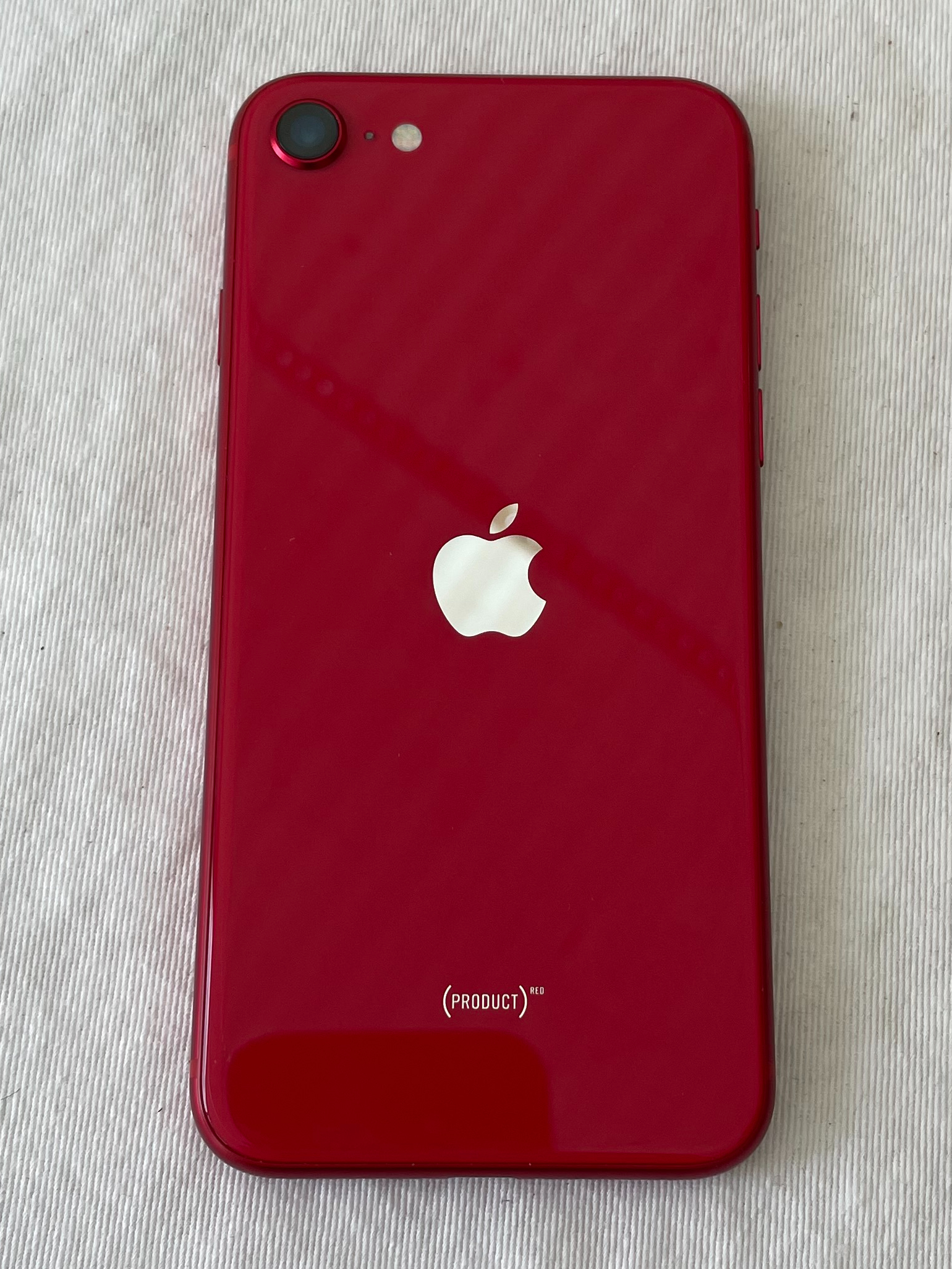
Back of the second-generation iPhone SE in Product Red

The iPhone SE features an aluminum frame, paired with a glass front and back. It shares the same physical sizes and dimensions as the iPhone 8 and is externally identical, except for a centered Apple logo and the removal of the iPhone branding in the lower midsection. As a result, phone cases made to fit the iPhone 8 will also fit the iPhone SE.

The iPhone SE is available in three colors: Black, White, and a Product Red edition. Though the offered colors line up with those of the iPhone 8 (Silver, Space Gray, and Product Red respectively, with no equivalent to the Gold model), the iPhone SE uses a noticeably deeper shade of black, a brighter shade of white, and a lighter shade of Product Red. The black and white colors are reminiscent of those on the iPhone XR, while the Product Red looks very similar to that on the iPhone 11. Unlike all prior white and silver iPhones from the iPhone 4 to the iPhone 8, except for the iPhone 5C, the 2020 iPhone SE features black bezels around the display on all models, matching the color schemes of the iPhone 11 and iPhone XR.

Color	Name	Bezel
	Black	Black
	White	Black
	Product Red	Black

==== Size ====
With a screen diagonal of 4.7 in (120 mm), the second generation of the iPhone SE was among the smallest mainstream in-production smartphones at the time of its release. However, it is still thirty percent larger than the first generation variant, whose screen diagonal measures 4 in (100 mm).

Dan Seifert from The Verge declared the second-generation SE a "nail in the coffin" for small phones. This was affirmed by CNET, who stated that "Apple's decision to not build a brand-new 4-inch screen phone is telling. It signals that the company will probably never bring back the tiny iPhone, no matter how badly people crave it."

=== Hardware ===
The iPhone SE incorporates the Apple A13 Bionic (7 nm) architecture system on a chip (SoC), with an integrated M13 motion coprocessor and third-generation neural engine. It is available in three internal storage configurations: 64 GB, 128 GB, and 256 GB. The SE has the same IP67 rating for dust and water resistance as the iPhone 8. The phone lacks the ultra-wideband features enabled by the U1 chip found in the iPhone 11 and 11 Pro. Despite the phone's smaller size which may lead to increased thermal throttling, the SE's A13 SoC runs at the same peak CPU frequencies as the iPhone 11. Like the iPhone 7 and 8 that were previously available in the same form factor, but unlike the iPhone 6, 6S and first-generation iPhone SE, the second-generation iPhone SE does not feature a standard 3.5 mm stereo headphone jack.

==== Display ====
The iPhone SE features the same HD Retina display found on the iPhone 8, using IPS technology with True Tone and wide color gamut (Display P3). The display has a resolution of 1334 × 750 pixels, like the previous 4.7 in (120 mm) iPhones. The pixel density is 326 PPI, the same as on all iPhones with LCDs since the introduction of the Retina display on the iPhone 4, excluding the Plus models. The pressure-sensing 3D Touch feature found on the iPhone 8 has been replaced with Haptic Touch on the iPhone SE, which initially did not work for notifications, but was later fixed in iOS 14. It can play HDR10 and Dolby Vision content despite not having an HDR-ready display, done by down-converting the HDR content to fit the display while still having some enhancements to dynamic range, contrast, and wide color gamut compared to standard content.

==== Camera ====
The iPhone SE has a rear 12 MP camera with a single lens, similar to the single lens camera system of the iPhone 8, capable of recording 4K video (at 24, 25, 30, or 60 fps), 1080p HD video (at 30, 25 or 60 fps), or 720p HD video (at 30 fps). The camera has an aperture of ƒ/1.8, autofocus, optical image stabilization, and a quad-LED True Tone flash. The phone can also take panoramas up to 63 MP, and shoot photos in burst mode. The front camera is 7 MP with an aperture of f/2.2 and autofocus, capable of shooting 1080p HD video at 30 fps. The camera interface adopts "QuickTake" from the 11 and 11 Pro, which allows the user to long-press the shutter button to take a video. The burst function can now be accessed by swiping the shutter button to the left.

The new image signal processor and neural engine of the SE support several camera functions not supported on the iPhone 8. Like the 11 and 11 Pro, the rear camera supports next-generation Smart HDR. The rear camera also supports extended dynamic range video up to 30 fps, stereo recording and cinematic video stabilization. Both the front and rear cameras of the iPhone SE support Portrait mode and Portrait Lighting. Like the 11 and 11 Pro, Portrait mode has depth control and an advanced bokeh effect (blurring effect of the out-of-focus background around the portrait). However, the usage of older sensor hardware results in some limitations—the iPhone SE does not support the Night Mode or Deep Fusion features of the iPhone 11 and 11 Pro. The SE's implementation of Portrait mode only natively supports images of humans, as the hardware does not produce depth maps through the use of focus pixels and instead relies on software-based machine learning.

=== Software ===
The iPhone SE was originally supplied with iOS 13.4, supporting Apple Pay and the Apple Card. iOS 13.4.1, an update fixing bugs related to Bluetooth and FaceTime, was released on April 23, 2020 (a day prior to the device's official release), making it a day-one software update.

The iPhone SE has received updates to every version of iOS since, including the latest version, iOS 27, making it one of the longest supported iPhones ever.

== Reception ==
=== Critical reviews ===
TechRadar praised the second-generation iPhone SE in their review for its light frame, performance, and price, but criticized its battery life, outdated screen technology, and the absence of a headphone jack.

GIGA.de similarly praised the phone's high performance, compact build and features while criticizing its small display, camera, and battery life.

=== Controversy ===
==== Power adapter and EarPods ====
Apple, citing an environmental initiative, removed the EarPods (except in France) and power adapter from all new iPhone boxes beginning in October 2020, including the iPhone SE (2nd generation). Apple claimed that removing these items will reduce e-waste and permit a smaller iPhone box, allowing more devices to be shipped simultaneously to decrease carbon footprint. However, Apple now includes a USB-C to Lightning cable which is incompatible with the existing USB-A power adapters that Apple previously shipped with their devices. Upgraders can still use their existing iPhone power adapters and cables, but users wanting fast charging capabilities will have to purchase a USB-C power adapter separately.

== See also ==
- List of iPhone models
- History of iPhone
- Timeline of iPhone models

Preceded by iPhone SE (1st)	iPhone e/SE; 13th generation	Succeeded by iPhone SE (3rd)
