= IPhone 13 Pro =

2021 smartphone by Apple

iPhone 13 Pro iPhone 13 Pro Max

- iPhone 13 Pro in Sierra Blue
- Developer: Apple
- Type: Smartphone
- Series: iPhone Pro
- First released: September 24, 2021; 5 years ago
- Availability by region: September 24, 2021: Australia; Austria; Belgium; Canada; China mainland; Croatia; Czech Republic; Denmark; Egypt; Finland; France; Germany; Hong Kong; Hungary; Ireland; India; Italy; Japan; Luxembourg; Netherlands; New Zealand; Norway; Poland; Portugal; Romania; Russia; Saudi Arabia; Serbia; Somalia; Singapore; Spain; Sweden; Switzerland; Taiwan; United Arab Emirates; United Kingdom; United States; October 1, 2021: Brazil; Turkey; October 8, 2021: Malaysia; Mexico; South Africa; South Korea; Thailand; October 14, 2021: Israel; October 22, 2021: Morocco; Philippines; Colombia; Vietnam; Pakistan; October 29, 2021: Bangladesh; November 19, 2021: Indonesia
- Discontinued: September 7, 2022; 4 years ago
- Predecessor: iPhone 12 Pro and Pro Max
- Successor: iPhone 14 Pro and Pro Max
- Related: iPhone 13 and 13 Mini
- Compatible networks: GSM, CDMA, 3G, EVDO, HSPA+, 4G LTE, 5G
- Form factor: Slate
- Colors: Sierra Blue; Graphite; Gold; Silver; Alpine Green
- Dimensions: Pro: 146.7×71.5×7.65 mm (5.776×2.815×0.301 in); Pro Max: 160.8×78.1×7.65 mm (6.331×3.075×0.301 in)
- Weight: Pro: 204 g (7.2 oz); Pro Max: 240 g (8.5 oz)
- Operating system: Original: iOS 15; Current: iOS 27.2.1, released November 9, 2026
- System-on-chip: A15 Bionic
- Memory: 6 GB LPDDR4X
- Storage: 128 GB, 256 GB, 512 GB, or 1 TB NVMe
- SIM: nanoSIM and eSIM (Note: eSIM not available in mainland China models. Dual SIM in dual stand-by (mainland China, Hong Kong and Macau models).)
- Battery: Pro: 11.97 Wh (3,095 mAh) lithium-ion battery @ 3.83 V; Pro Max: 16.75 Wh (4352 mAh) lithium-ion battery @ 3.83 V
- Charging: Lightning charging (12 W); USB PD via Lightning fast charging (20-27 W) for the Pro Max and (20-23 W) for the Pro; MagSafe wireless charging (15 W)
- Rear camera: 12 MP Sony IMX703 1.9μm, f/1.5, 26 mm (wide), dual pixel PDAF, sensor-shift OIS, 3× optical zoom; 12 MP Sony IMX713 1μm, f/2.8, 77 mm (telephoto), PDAF, OIS; 12 MP Sony IMX772 1μm, f/1.8, 13 mm, 120˚ (ultrawide), PDAF, 2× optical zoom; Sony IMX590 TOF 3D LiDAR scanner (depth)
- Front camera: 12 MP Sony IMX514, f/2.2
- Display: 13 Pro: 6.1 inch (155 mm) diagonal, 2532 × 1170 px at 460 ppi, (19.5:9 aspect ratio) supplied by Samsung Display; 13 Pro Max: 6.7 in (170 mm), 2778 × 1284 px at 458 ppi, (19.5:9 aspect ratio) supplied by Samsung Display; Super Retina XDR; P3 wide color gamut; 1000 cd/m^{2} max. brightness (typical), 1200 cd/m^{2} max. brightness (HDR); ProMotion 10-120 Hz variable refresh rate
- Sound: Spatial Audio, Dolby Atmos, and lossless audio (Apple Music)
- Connectivity: Wi‑Fi 6 (802.11ax), Bluetooth 5.0, ultra-wideband (UWB); GPS, GLONASS, Galileo, QZSS, BeiDou
- Data inputs: List of inputs: Multi-touch screen; LiDAR scanner; 3 microphones; Motion coprocessor; 3-axis gyroscope; 3-axis accelerometer; iBeacon; Barometer; Digital compass; Proximity sensor; Ambient light sensor; Face ID
- Water resistance: IP68 IEC standard 60529 (splash, water, and dust resistant)
- Hearing aid compatibility: M3, T4
- Made in: China
- Other: FaceTime Audio or Video at 1080p over Wi-Fi and 5G, Voice over LTE
- Website: iPhone 13 Pro and iPhone 13 Pro Max – Apple at the Wayback Machine (archived September 14, 2021)

The iPhone 13 Pro and iPhone 13 Pro Max are smartphones developed and marketed by Apple. They were the flagship smartphones in the fifteenth generation of the iPhone, succeeding the iPhone 12 Pro and Pro Max respectively. The devices were unveiled alongside the iPhone 13 and iPhone 13 Mini at an Apple Special Event at Apple Park in Cupertino, California, on September 14, 2021, and became available ten days later, on September 24. They were discontinued on September 7, 2022, as well as the iPhone 11 and iPhone 12 mini, following the announcement of the iPhone 14 and iPhone 14 Pro.

The iPhone 13 Pro and Pro Max are the last Pro-level iPhones to feature a notch cutout, albeit smaller, as the iPhone 14 Pro and later use the Dynamic Island. However, the smaller notch used on the iPhone 13 Pro and Pro Max as well as the iPhone 13 and iPhone 13 Mini is still used on the standard iPhone 14 and 14 Plus, as well as budget models like the iPhone 16e and iPhone 17e.

Major upgrades over its predecessor include improved battery life, improved cameras and computational photography, rack focus for video in a new "Cinematic Mode" at 1080p 30 fps, Apple ProRes video recording, a smaller notch by almost 20%, a new A15 Bionic system on a chip, and a variable 10–120 Hz display, marketed as ProMotion.

== Overview ==
The iPhone 13 Pro and iPhone 13 Pro Max were officially announced alongside the ninth-generation iPad, 6th generation iPad Mini, Apple Watch Series 7, iPhone 13, and iPhone 13 Mini by a virtual press event filmed and recorded at Apple Park in Cupertino, California on September 14, 2021. Pre-orders began on September 17 at 5:00 AM PST. Pricing starts at US$999 for the iPhone 13 Pro and US$1099 for the iPhone 13 Pro Max, the same as their respective previous generations. The iPhone 13 Pro and 13 Pro Max was the first to have a thinner notch thanks to the front-firing speaker being moved to the upper edge of the TrueDepth sensor housing, a 120 Hz display and a 1TB storage option.

On September 7, 2022, Apple discontinued and removed the iPhone 13 Pro and iPhone 13 Pro Max as well as the iPhone 11 and iPhone 12 Mini from their official website following the release of the iPhone 14, iPhone 14 Plus, iPhone 14 Pro and iPhone 14 Pro Max. In the same year, this phone was the last generation of iPhone to be on sale in Russia before the suspension of sales for newer generations in the country due to the Russian invasion of Ukraine.

In March 2023, Apple began selling refurbished iPhone 13 Pro models on their official website.

The phone was manufactured on contract by Foxconn and Luxshare.

== Design ==
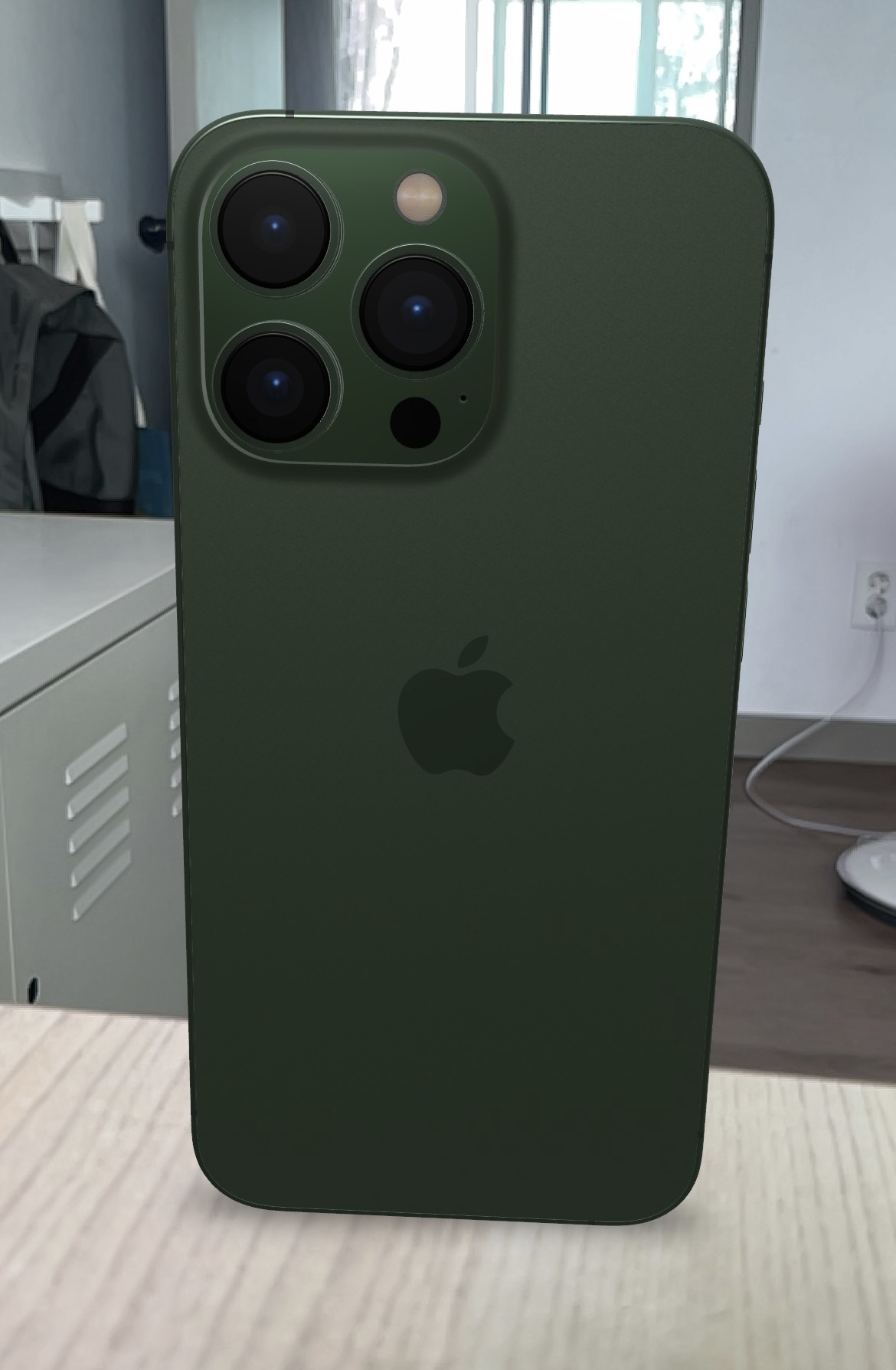
An AR view of the Alpine Green model of the iPhone 13 Pro

The iPhone 13 Pro and iPhone 13 Pro Max's design is mostly unchanged from their respective predecessors. However, the rear camera module now covers a larger area due to the larger lenses. The Face ID and camera module on the front display, or "notch", is now 20% smaller than in previous generations.

The back side of the iPhone 13 Pro is made of a matte glass finish and the front is protected by Gorilla Glass.

The iPhone 13 Pro and 13 Pro Max are available in five colors: Silver, Graphite, Gold, Sierra Blue, and Alpine Green. Sierra Blue is a new color replacing Pacific Blue.

On March 8, 2022, at Apple's Special Event "Peek Performance", Apple revealed a new Alpine Green color option, which became available on March 18, 2022.

Color	Name
	Silver
	Graphite
	Gold
	Sierra Blue
	Alpine Green

== Specifications ==
=== Hardware ===
The iPhone 13 Pro and Pro Max use an Apple-designed A15 Bionic processor featuring a 16-core neural engine, 6-core CPU (with 2 performance cores and 4 efficiency cores), and 5-core GPU. The A15 Bionic also contains a new image processor.

The iPhone 13 Pro achieved an AnTuTu benchmark score of 846,433, which makes its graphic loading smooth.

More 5G bands are available to support more carriers, especially outside the US.

==== Display ====
The iPhone 13 Pro has a 6.06 inch (154 mm) (marketed as 6.1-inch (150 mm)) OLED display with a resolution of 2532 × 1170 pixels (2.9 megapixels) at 460 PPI, while the iPhone 13 Pro Max has a 6.68 inch (170 mm) (marketed as 6.7-inch (170 mm)) OLED display with a resolution of 2778 × 1284 pixels (3.5 megapixels) at 458 PPI. Both models have the Super Retina XDR OLED display with improved typical brightness up to 1,000 nits from 800 nits, and max brightness up to 1,200 nits, and a variable 10–120 Hz ProMotion display, which can also go as low as 10 Hz to preserve battery. The ProMotion name was previously used on the iPad Pro (2nd Generation) and later models.

==== Battery ====
Apple claims up to 1.5 more hours of battery life on the iPhone 13 Pro, and 2.5 more hours on the 13 Pro Max than their respective predecessors. Rated capacities are 11.97 Wh (3,095 mAh) on the iPhone 13 Pro an increase from the 10.78 Wh (2,815 mAh) battery found in the iPhone 12 Pro, while the iPhone 13 Pro Max is rated at 16.75 Wh (4,352 mAh) another increase from the 14.13 Wh (3,687 mAh) battery found in the iPhone 12 Pro Max. Both models can charge with MagSafe up to 15 W, Qi wireless charging up to 7.5 W, and Lightning up to 20-23 W for the Pro model, 20-27 W for the Pro Max model.

==== Camera ====
The iPhone 13 Pro features four cameras: one front-facing camera for selfie and three rear-facing cameras which include a telephoto, wide, and ultra-wide camera. The rear-facing cameras all contain larger sensors than the iPhone 12 Pro, allowing for more light-gathering. The wide and ultra-wide also have larger apertures to capture more light and increase low-light performance. The ultra-wide camera also has autofocus for the first time. The 77 mm telephoto has a smaller aperture than the 12 Pro's, but has the advantage of being able to use Night Mode. The larger telephoto also increases the digital zoom capability to 15x.

The cameras use a new computational photography engine, called Smart HDR 4. Smart HDR 4 processes recognized faces in photos separately using local adjustments. Users can also choose from a range of photographic styles during capture, including rich contrast, vibrant, warm, and cool. Apple clarifies this is different than a filter because it works intelligently with the image processing algorithm during capture to apply local adjustments to an image.

The camera app contains a new mode called Cinematic Mode, which allows users to rack focus between subjects and create a shallow depth of field using software algorithms. It is supported on wide, telephoto, and front-facing cameras in 1080p at 30 fps. Apple also added in iOS 15.1 the ability to record in Apple ProRes 4K at 30 fps and 1080p at 60 fps for models with at least 256 GB of storage, however base models with 128 GB of storage will be limited to ProRes recording at 1080p at 30 fps.

The camera features a macro mode that can focus as close as 2 centimeters from a subject. It utilizes the autofocus from the ultra-wide camera and is automatically enabled when close enough to a subject.

=== Software ===
iPhone 13 Pro and iPhone 13 Pro Max originally shipped with iOS 15. They received the iOS 16 update, which was released on September 12, 2022, and iOS 17, which was released on September 18, 2023. The Qi2 wireless charging standard has been added to the iPhone 13 Pro and iPhone 13 Pro Max with the update to iOS 17.2. They are also compatible with iOS 18 released in late 2024, and iOS 26, released in late 2025.

These phones support the current public release of iOS, which is currently iOS 27.

== Reception ==
The iPhone 13 Pro and iPhone 13 Pro Max were praised by reviewers and journalists for its marked improvement in battery life, improved set of cameras, and the addition of ProMotion to the iPhone. The devices have repeatedly been said to have "the best camera in a smartphone."

== See also ==
- History of the iPhone
- List of iPhone models
- Timeline of iPhone models

== Notes ==
Preceded by iPhone 12 Pro / 12 Pro Max	iPhone; 15th generation alongside iPhone 13 / 13 Mini	Succeeded by iPhone 14 Pro / 14 Pro Max
