= IPhone 11 =

Smartphone by Apple

iPhone 11

- iPhone 11 in Green
- Developer: Apple
- Manufacturer: Foxconn (on contract)
- Type: Smartphone
- Generation: 13th
- First released: September 20, 2019; 7 years ago
- Availability by region: September 20, 2019: Australia; Austria; Belgium; Canada; China, Mainland; Czech Republic; Denmark; Finland; France; Germany; Hong Kong; Ireland; Italy; Japan; Mexico; Netherlands; New Zealand; Norway; Poland; Portugal; Russia; Saudi Arabia; Somalia; Singapore; Spain; Sweden; Switzerland; Taiwan; United Arab Emirates; United Kingdom; United States; September 26, 2019: Israel; September 27, 2019: Albania; Armenia; Bahrain; Bosnia and Herzegovina; Bulgaria; Croatia; Cyprus; Estonia; Georgia; Hungary; Iceland; India; Kuwait; Latvia; Liechtenstein; Luxembourg; Malaysia; Malta; Monaco; Morocco; Oman; Qatar; Serbia; Slovakia; Slovenia; Romania; South Africa; October 18, 2019: Brazil; Thailand; Turkey; Chile; October 25, 2019: Philippines; Montenegro; South Korea; October 26, 2019: Egypt; November 1, 2019: Vietnam; November 2, 2019: Bangladesh; December 6, 2019: Indonesia
- Discontinued: September 7, 2022; 4 years ago
- Predecessor: iPhone XR
- Successor: iPhone 12 and 12 Mini
- Related: iPhone 11 Pro and Pro Max
- Compatible networks: 2G / 3G / 4G LTE
- Form factor: Slate
- Dimensions: H: 150.9 mm (5.94 in); W: 75.7 mm (2.98 in); D: 8.3 mm (0.33 in)
- Weight: 194 g (6.8 oz)
- Operating system: Original: iOS 13; Current: iOS 27.2, released October 26, 2026
- System-on-chip: A13 Bionic
- CPU: Hexa-core (2× high power Lightning cores at 2.66 GHz + 4× low power Thunder cores at 1.82 GHz)
- GPU: Apple-designed 4-core, up to 690 GFLOPS
- Modem: Dual SIM with eSIM; Intel Gigabit-Class LTE, up to 30 LTE bands
- Memory: 4 GB LPDDR4X RAM
- Storage: 64, 128 or 256 GB
- Battery: 3110 mAh Li-ion (3.83 V)
- Charging: Fast charging, Qi wireless charging
- Rear camera: 12 MP (1.4 μm) (1/2.55″), quad-LED flash, ƒ/1.8 aperture, Optical image stabilization (Wide-angle only) quad-LED flash, autofocus, IR filter, Burst mode, Five‑element lens (Ultra Wide); six‑element lens (Wide), 4K video recording at 24, 30 or 60 fps or 1080p at 30 or 60 fps, Slow-motion video (1080p at 120 fps or 240 fps), Time-lapse with stabilization, Panorama (up to 63 megapixels), Portrait Mode, Portrait Lighting, Face detection, Digital image stabilization, Optical image stabilization, Stereo audio recording, Night Mode
- Front camera: 12 MP, f/2.2 aperture, burst mode, exposure control, face detection, auto-HDR, auto image stabilization, Retina flash, 4K video recording at 24, 30 or 60 fps or 1080p HD at 30 or 60 fps, Slow-motion video (1080p at 120 fps) Portrait Mode, Portrait Lighting and Animoji
- Display: 6.1-inch (155 mm) diagonal Liquid Retina: LED-backlit IPS LCD, 1792×828 px (326 ppi); 625 cd/m^{2} max. brightness (typical), with dual-ion exchange-strengthened glass and Haptic Touch.
- Sound: Stereo speakers
- Connectivity: Wi-Fi 6 (802.11ax), Bluetooth 5.0, Ultra-wideband (UWB)
- Water resistance: IP68, up to 2 m (6.6 ft) for 30 minutes
- Made in: China
- Other: FaceTime audio- or video-calling, USB-C to Lightning, Voice over LTE
- Website: iPhone 11 at the Wayback Machine (archived October 9, 2020)

The iPhone 11 is a smartphone that was developed and marketed by Apple. It is the thirteenth generation of iPhone, succeeding the iPhone XR, and was unveiled on September 10, 2019, alongside the higher-end iPhone 11 Pro and 11 Pro Max at the Steve Jobs Theater at Apple Park in Cupertino, California, by Apple CEO Tim Cook. Pre-orders began on September 13, 2019, and the phone was officially released on September 20, 2019, one day after the official public release of iOS 13 and was therefore was considered an "affordable flagship" or "budget flagship" phone at its release just like its predecessor.

Despite minimal exterior changes from the preceding iPhone XR, substantial design changes within the phone took place, including the addition of the more powerful Apple A13 Bionic chip as well as an ultra-wide dual-camera system. In October 2020, Apple halted the inclusion of both Apple EarPods and the wall adapter, citing environmental goals.

As of March 2022, the iPhone 11 had sold approximately 159.2 million units worldwide, making it the tenth best-selling smartphone of all time. While Apple has not released model-specific sales figures for the iPhone 11 after this date, the company announced in July 2025 that total iPhone sales have surpassed 3 billion units globally.

The iPhone 11, as well as the iPhone 12 Mini, 13 Pro and 13 Pro Max, were discontinued and removed from Apple's website after the announcement of the iPhone 14 and iPhone 14 Pro on September 7, 2022.

The iPhone 11 is the longest supported iPhone ever, along with the iPhone 11 Pro and SE (2nd generation), supporting eight major versions of iOS from iOS 13 through iOS 27.

== History ==
Details regarding the smartphone were widely leaked before the official release; complete specifications and renderings of the phone were widely publicized. Among the most significant changes were improvements in the cameras and the continuation of the 'notch' design around the frontal camera which dipped down into the screen, a feature started by the iPhone X. The official event invite which was sent out to developers contained a graphic featuring an Apple logo made of layered colored glass, implied to be the new colors for the phone. A patent filed by Apple earlier in the year also hinted at a new camera design.

== Design ==
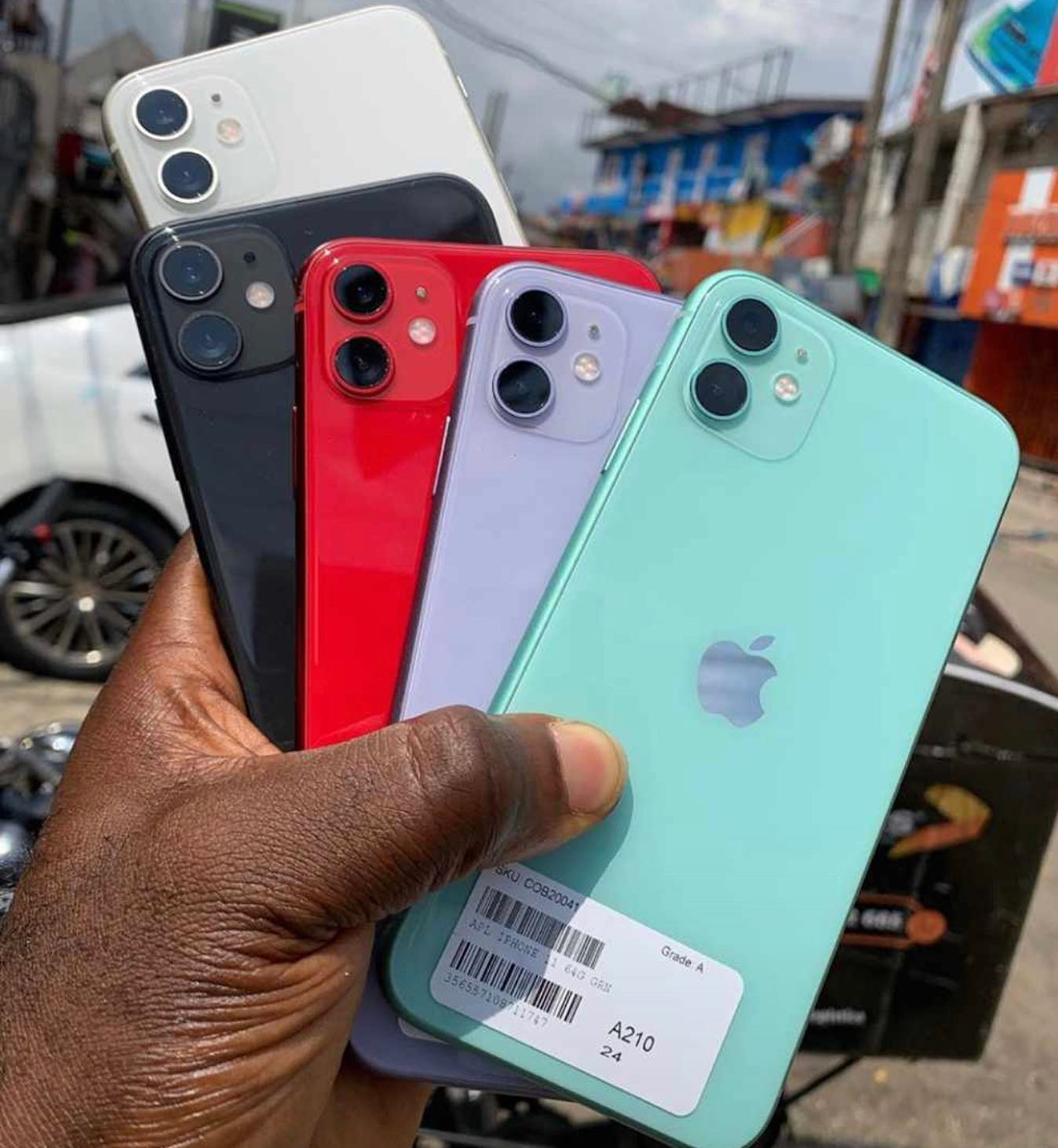
iPhone 11's back cover variant colors

The iPhone 11 was available in six colors: Purple, Yellow, Green, Black, White and Product (Red). The top of the screen retains the 'notch' design, wherein the TrueDepth camera system and phone speaker are encapsulated in a black, rounded-out rectangle that dips into the screen, similar to its predecessor, the iPhone XR. An elevated area in the top corner on the back of the iPhone acts as a camera housing, containing the microphone, the flashlight, and both of the rear-facing digital cameras. The Apple logo on the back of the phone is centered to be equidistant to all edges and is made of a reflective material.

Color	Name
	Black
	White
	Purple
	Yellow
	Green
	Product Red

== Specifications ==
=== Hardware ===
The iPhone 11, along with the iPhone 11 Pro, uses Apple's A13 Bionic processor, which contains a third-generation neural engine. It has three internal storage options: 64 GB, 128 GB, and 256 GB. It also has 4 GB of RAM. The iPhone 11 has an IP68 water- and dust-resistant rating along with dirt and grime, and is water-resistant up to 2 m (6.6 ft) for 30 minutes. However, the manufacturer's warranty does not cover liquid damage to the phone. Also, like previous iPhones, both phones do not have a headphone jack, and initially came with wired EarPods with a Lightning connector, although Apple no longer includes these with any device. The iPhone 11 is the first smartphone with built-in ultra-wideband hardware, via its Apple U1 chip.

==== Display ====
The iPhone 11 has a 6.1-inch (15 cm) IPS LCD with a resolution of 1792 × 828 pixels (1.4 megapixels) at a pixel density of 326 PPI with a maximum brightness of 625 nits and a 1400:1 contrast ratio and it is equivalent to the iPhone XR. It supports Dolby Vision, HDR10, True-Tone, and a wide color gamut. As with the iPhone 11 Pro, XR, XS, and X, the display has a notch at the top for the TrueDepth camera system and the speaker. The display has an oleophobic coating, making it fingerprint-resistant. Apple announced in September 2019 that both the iPhone 11 and iPhone 11 Pro would show a warning notification if a display were replaced with an unauthorized part. Apple stated that problems with the phone could arise if the wrong parts or procedures were used during the repair process.

==== Battery ====
The iPhone 11 is supplied with a 11.91 Wh (3,110 mAh) battery, a slight increase from the 11.21 Wh (2,942 mAh) found in the iPhone XR. The battery is not user-replaceable.

==== Camera ====
The iPhone 11 includes a dual-lens 12 MP rear camera array. It has one ƒ/2.4 ultra-wide-angle lens with a 120° field of view and 2× optical zoom out, and one ƒ/1.8 wide-angle lens. The iPhone 11 supports 4K video at up to 60 fps and 1080p slow motion at up to 240 fps. The phone also features an audio zoom feature, which focuses audio on the area being zoomed in, similar to the Pro model. Both of the cameras support video, although only the primary lens has OIS. It supports portrait mode with six portrait lighting effects, depth control, and an advanced bokeh effect. The phone also has an automatic night mode allowing the camera to take brighter pictures with reduced noise in low-light environments. Also, a redesigned camera app adds new features such as a scroll wheel for choosing between the different lenses and a feature called "QuickTake", which allows the user to long-press the shutter button to take a video. Apple has also announced a new Deep Fusion feature that takes advantage of AI and machine learning for image processing and was released via the iOS 13.2 software update on October 29, 2019.

=== Software ===
The iPhone 11 was supplied with iOS 13, which includes Siri, Face ID (through the TrueDepth camera), Apple Pay, and Apple Card support. It received iOS 14 on September 16, 2020, iOS 15 on September 20, 2021, iOS 16 on September 12, 2022, iOS 17 on September 18, 2023, iOS 18 on September 16, 2024, and iOS 26 on September 15, 2025. It is also compatible with iOS 27, making it the first iPhone to support eight major iOS versions, alongside the iPhone SE (2nd generation).

== Reception ==
=== Critical reviews ===
The iPhone 11 drew generally positive reviews after its launch. Reviews generally praised the phone's performance, battery life, and cameras, while criticizing the display as passable, but aging quickly. Reviewers also criticized the notch as being far too large for 2019. According to Counterpoint Research's Market Pulse, it was the second best-selling and the most popular model globally for 2019, in less than four months of launch.

=== Controversy ===
==== Removal of the power adapter and EarPods ====
Apple, through an environmental initiative, has removed the EarPods and power adapter from new iPhone boxes starting October 2020, including the iPhone 11. Removing these items is claimed to reduce e-waste and permit a smaller iPhone box, allowing more devices to be transported simultaneously to decrease carbon footprint. However, Apple now includes a USB-C to Lightning cable, incompatible with the existing USB-A power adapters that Apple previously supplied with their devices. Upgraders can still use their existing iPhone power adapters and cables, but users wanting fast charging capabilities will have to purchase a USB-C power adapter separately.

== See also ==
- History of the iPhone
- List of iPhone models
- List of best-selling mobile phones
- Timeline of iPhone models

Preceded by iPhone XR	iPhone; 13th generation alongside iPhone 11 Pro / 11 Pro Max	Succeeded by iPhone 12 / 12 Mini
