= IPhone SE (1st generation) =

Smartphone developed by Apple

iPhone SE

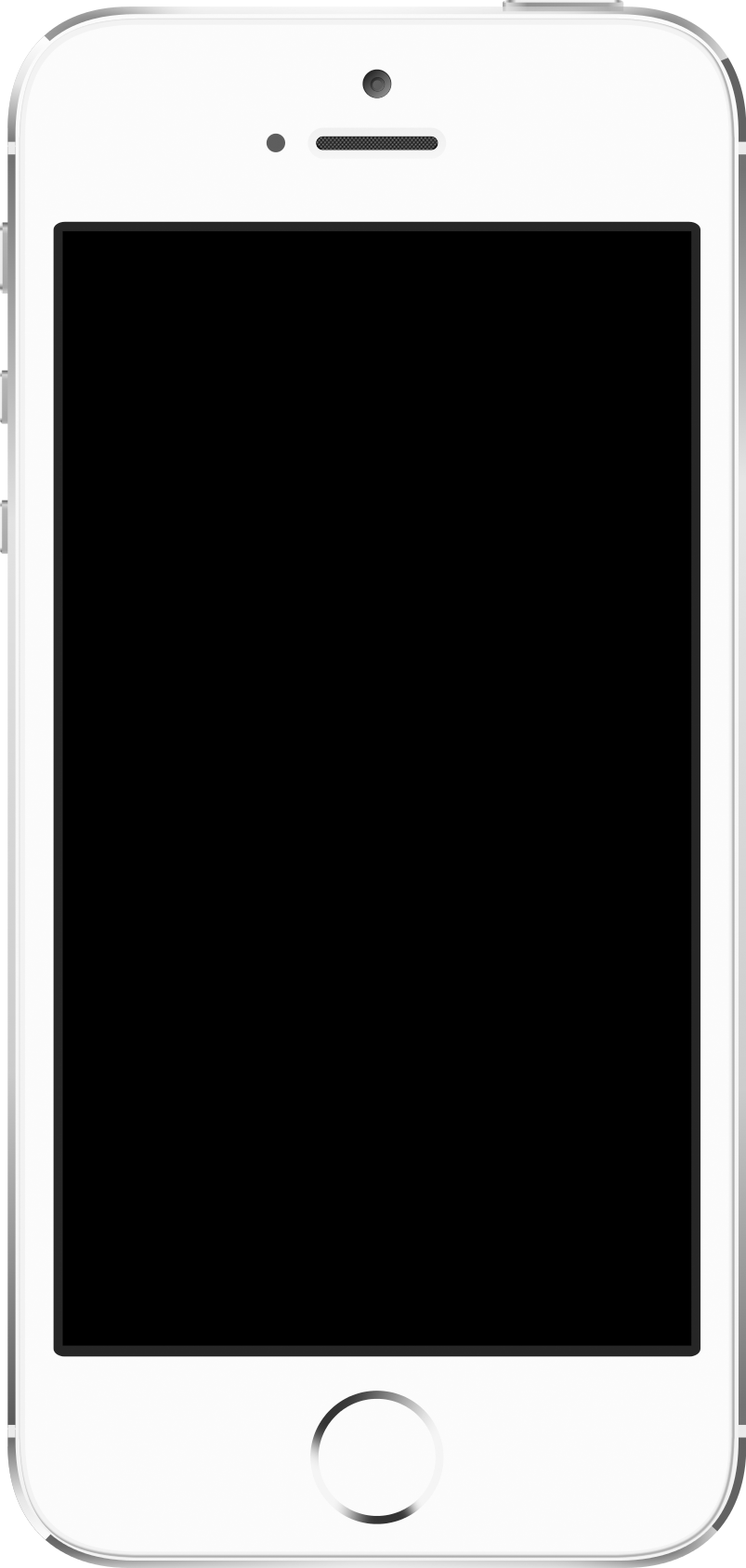
- The first-generation iPhone SE
- Brand: Apple
- Manufacturers: Foxconn (on contract); Wistron (on contract, for Indian market)
- Type: Smartphone
- First released: March 31, 2016; 10 years ago
- Discontinued: September 12, 2018; 8 years ago
- Predecessor: iPhone 5c
- Successor: iPhone SE (2nd generation)
- Compatible networks: GSM, LTE, 3G, 4G, EDGE, UMTS, HSPA+, DC-HSDPA, CDMA, EVDO
- Form factor: Slate
- Colors: Space Grey; Silver; Rose Gold; Gold
- Dimensions: H: 123.8 mm (4.87 in); W: 58.6 mm (2.31 in); D: 7.6 mm (0.30 in)
- Weight: 113 g (4.0 oz)
- Operating system: Original: iOS 9.3.1; Current: iOS 15.8.8, released May 11, 2026
- System-on-chip: Apple A9
- Memory: 2 GB LPDDR4
- Storage: 16, 32, 64, or 128 GB NAND connected via NVMe
- Battery: 3.82 V, 6.21 W⋅h (1624 mA⋅h) built-in rechargeable LiPo
- Charging: Lightning connector
- Rear camera: Backlit Sony Exmor RS IMX315 12.2 MP (4032 x 3024, 1.22 μm), dual-tone LED flash, autofocus, IR filter, burst mode, f/2.2 aperture, 4K video recording at 30 fps, 1080p at 30 or 60 fps, slow-motion video (1080p at 120 fps and 720p at 240 fps)
- Front camera: 1.2 MP, f/2.4 aperture, exposure control, face detection, auto-HDR, Retina Flash, 720p video recording
- Display: 4.0 in (100 mm) Retina Display, LED-backlit IPS LCD, 1136 × 640 pixel resolution (326 ppi, aspect ratio 16:9) with full sRGB standard, 500 cd/m^{2} max. brightness (typical), 800:1 contrast ratio (typical)
- Sound: Mono speaker, 3.5 mm stereo audio jack
- Connectivity: Near-field communication (NFC), Bluetooth 4.2, GPS, GLONASS, Wi-Fi (802.11 a/b/g/n/ac), VoLTE, Wi-Fi calling, Lightning connector, 3.5 mm stereo audio jack
- Data inputs: Multi-touch touchscreen display, Apple M9 motion coprocessor, 3-axis gyroscope, accelerometer, digital compass, proximity sensor, ambient light sensor, Touch ID fingerprint reader, microphone
- Hearing aid compatibility: M3, T4
- Website: iPhone SE – Apple at the Wayback Machine (archived January 2, 2017)

The first-generation iPhone SE (also known as iPhone SE 1st Generation or iPhone SE 2016; SE is an initialism of Special Edition) is a smartphone that was developed and marketed by Apple. It is part of the ninth generation of the iPhone alongside the higher-end iPhone 6s and 6s Plus. It was introduced on March 21, 2016, with pre-orders beginning on March 24, 2016, and was officially released on March 31, 2016, alongside the 9.7-inch iPad Pro. It was re-released on March 24, 2017, with larger storage capacities.

The iPhone SE shares the same physical design and dimensions as the iPhone 5s, but has similar internal hardware to the iPhone 6s, including the newer Apple A9 system-on-chip, greater battery capacity, and a 12-megapixel rear camera that can record up to 4K video at 30 frames per second. The iPhone SE can shoot Live Photos and has features like Retina Flash and the option to have Hey Siri activated without the need to be plugged into a power source.

The iPhone SE was discontinued and removed from the official website by Apple on September 12, 2018. The A9-based SE, 6s and 6s Plus are the first iPhones to be supported through seven major versions of iOS, from iOS 9 to iOS 15.

Its successor, the iPhone SE (2020), was announced on April 15, 2020, and released on April 24, 2020.

The iPhone SE is the last iPhone to feature a 4-inch display, a standard 3.5 mm stereo headphone jack, and 16 GB of internal storage.

== History ==
The previous major redesign of the iPhone, the 4.7-inch iPhone 6 and the 5.5-inch iPhone 6 Plus, resulted in larger screen sizes. However, a significant number of customers still preferred the smaller 4-inch screen size of iPhone 5, 5c, and 5s.

Leaks about a smaller, iPhone 5s-like phone with newer components started circulating in 2015. Guesses included "iPhone 5se", "iPhone 6 Mini", "iPhone 6c", and "iPhone SE" (which was the correct name of the phone).

Apple executive Greg Joswiak stated in the Let us loop you in event (held at the Town Hall auditorium in the Apple Campus) on March 21, 2016, that they sold over 30 million 4-inch iPhones in 2015, further explaining that some people love smaller compact phones. Later in the event, he announced the iPhone SE, describing it as "the most powerful four-inch phone ever". With a total mass of 113 grams (or 4.0 ounces), iPhone SE is one of the lightest iPhone models released, only surpassed by iPhone 5 and 5S (both having a total mass of 112 grams or 3.95 ounces). The iPhone SE, iPhone 6s, and iPhone 6s Plus are the last iPhones to feature a standard 3.5 mm stereo headphone jack.

No affordable successor to iPhone SE was announced during the September 12, 2018, Apple Special Event, and Business Insider stated that "Apple made a big mistake by removing its smallest and most affordable iPhone from its lineup", suggesting that the company was disregarding a significant number of customers who had been worried over the loss of the smaller design. This was affirmed by Computerworld, who claimed that "the harsh reality is that across some of Apple's biggest markets, wage growth has stagnated, and people are feeling the pinch", further stating that there will always exist consumers in the mid-tier smartphone markets.

In relation with the discontinuation of iPhone SE, Quartz mentioned on September 22, 2018, that women and other smartphone users with smaller hands had reported "pain from holding, scrolling, and swiping on phones, and a review of research on the ergonomics of handheld devices concludes that bigger products, like large phones and tablets, often result in overextension of the thumb and wrist", hinting to repetitive strain injury, and that oversized iPhones and smartphones in general can be physically unusable for some users. The technology website Gizmodo shared the same concern, hoping that "there will be a return to smaller phones", and expressed a desire "to hold one's phone in a single hand, and be able to use it fully".

On January 19, 2019, iPhone SE was back on sale as a clearance item for $249. However, by January 20, 2019, stock was sold out. On February 20, 2019, TechRadar announced that iPhone SE once again was on sale as a clearance item with a $100 price reduction. The price for the 32 GB version was $249, while the price for the 128 GB version was $299. The iPhones were unlocked, with AT&T, T-Mobile, or Verizon as optional SIM card carriers. It was available in all original colors, including Space Gray, Silver, Gold, and Rose Gold. On March 25, 2019 Gizmodo reported that iPhone SE was back in Apple's clearance shop, and added, "It's likely the last of Apple's stock that the company has finally put on clearance."

On April 15, 2020, the second-generation iPhone SE was announced as the successor to the original first-generation iPhone SE. The second-generation iPhone SE was released on April 24, 2020. However, the 2020 iPhone SE has a larger 4.7-inch screen size, leaving the original iPhone SE as the last iPhone to have the smaller 4.0-inch screen size.

=== Availability by region ===
March 31, 2016

- Australia
- Canada
- China, Mainland
- Denmark
- Egypt
- Eritrea
- France
- Germany
- Hong Kong
- Japan
- Netherlands
- Norway
- Puerto Rico
- Russia
- Singapore
- South Africa
- Sudan
- Sweden
- United Kingdom
- United States

April 5, 2016

- Austria
- Italy
- New Zealand
- Spain
- United Arab Emirates

April 6, 2016

- India
- Lithuania
- Nepal
- Serbia
- Switzerland

April 7, 2016

- Taiwan

April 8, 2016

- Ireland
- Turkey

April 21, 2016

- Israel

April 26, 2016

- Colombia
- Mexico

May 5, 2016

- Indonesia

May 11, 2016

- Chile
- Malaysia
- South Korea
- Thailand

May 12, 2016

- Vietnam

May 28, 2016

- Philippines

June 8, 2016

- Lebanon

== Specifications ==
=== Design ===
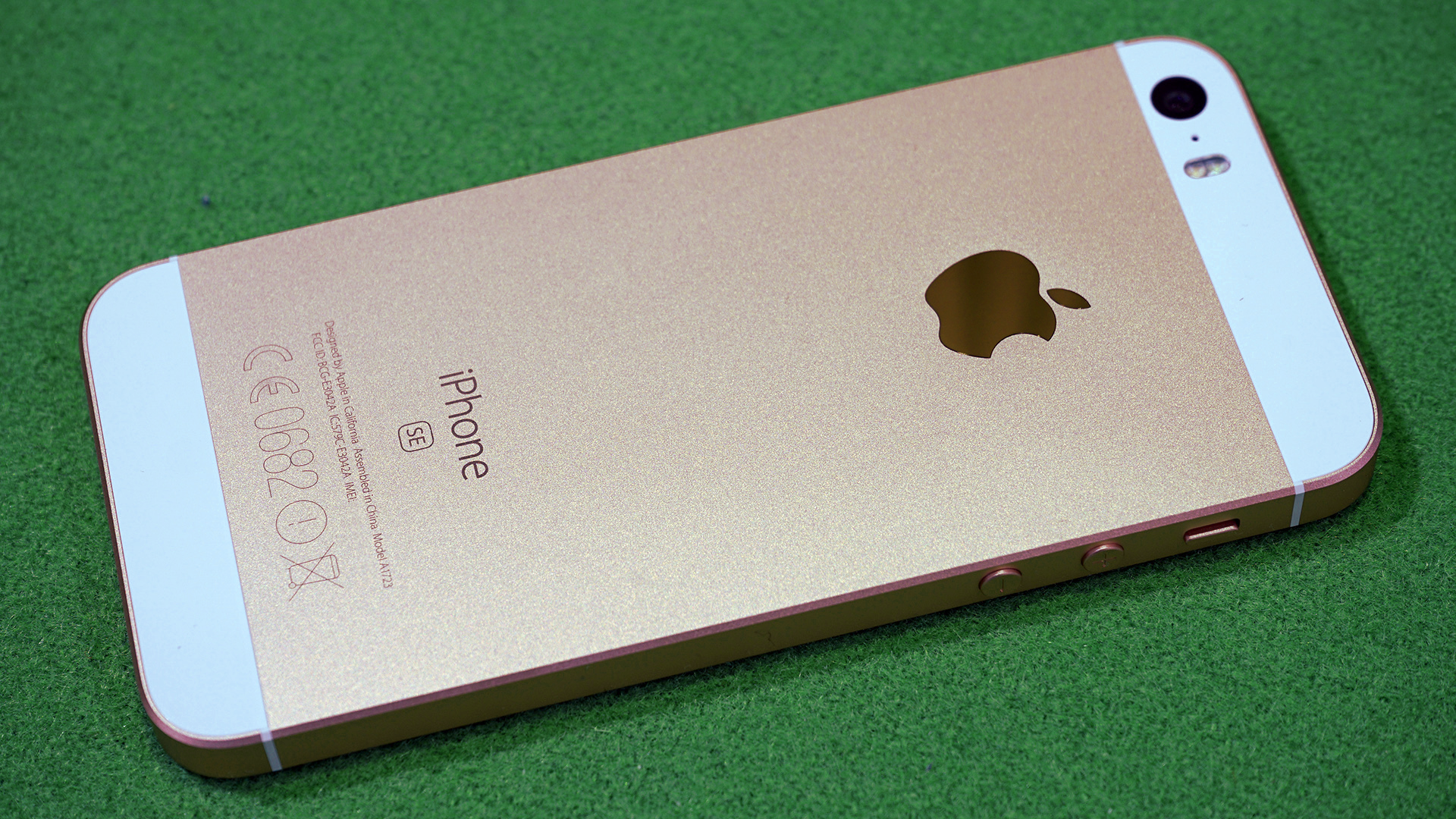
The rear of an iPhone SE in Rose Gold color finish

The exterior design of iPhone SE is nearly identical to that of iPhone 5 and 5S, with the exception of matte-chamfered edges and an inset stainless steel rear Apple logo. The iPhone SE shares the same physical sizes and dimensions, so cases designed to fit the 5 and 5S will also fit an iPhone SE. iPhone SE was available in the colors Space Gray, Silver, Gold, and Rose Gold.

Color	Name	Front
	Space Gray	Black
	Silver	White
	Gold	White
	Rose Gold	White

=== Hardware ===
iPhone SE incorporates the Apple A9 system-on-chip (SoC) with an M9 motion coprocessor and supports near field communication for Apple Pay. It was originally released with 16 GB or 64 GB of internal storage. It features a 12 megapixel rear-facing camera with the ability to record 2160p (4K) video at 30 frames per second and slow motion with 1080p at 120 fps and 720p at 240 fps options. The camera lacks optical image stabilization.

Unlike iPhone 6s and 6s Plus, the SE does not include 3D Touch, nor the updated faster second-generation Touch ID sensor from the 6s and 6s Plus, or its barometer.

Still photos with resolutions up to 6.5 megapixels (3412 × 1920) can be captured during video recording.

On March 21, 2017, Apple announced that it would double the storage for these models at the same launch prices. The upgraded models were released on March 24, 2017, with 32 GB or 128 GB of internal storage.

=== Software ===
iPhone SE originally shipped with iOS 9.3, supporting iPhone 6- and 6s-exclusive features such as Apple Pay, Live Photos, Retina Flash, and always-on Siri voice activation. The SE is compatible with iOS 15. During the WWDC 2019 Keynote, Apple announced, that iPhone SE, 6s, and 6s Plus would support most of the main features of iOS 13. This includes the new dark mode (which aims to reduce eye strain), and Low Data Mode for restricting background network (both Wi-Fi and mobile network) usage. Along with the iPhone 6s and 6s Plus, the iPhone SE is the oldest iPhone to support iOS 13, iOS 14, and iOS 15. Like the iPhone 6s and 6s Plus, it does not support iOS 16 due to hardware limitations.

== Reception ==
CNET considered the iPhone SE to be a "great choice at the small end, with no compromises", and lauded Apple for adapting iPhone 6s's hardware to three different form factors while "consumers loved the battery life and that it still had a headphone jack".

The Verge considered iPhone SE to be much-improved and well-designed with great battery life, and its screen size the only hindrance to multitasking and certain apps. Giving the device 8.7 out of 10, The Verge said the iPhone SE is "today's tech in yesterday's phone body" and warned not to overly praise something just for doing its job.

TechCrunch said it was "the best phone ever made", appealing to people who prefer a smaller, highly pocketable phone.

GSMArena wrote that iPhone SE "struck the right balance between size, cost and performance", helping Apple beat sales expectations, and that it was strategic in India and China where Apple struggles to match its Western markets.

Tom's Guide acclaimed iPhone SE for being an affordable and compact smartphone with a headphone jack, saying it can be both held comfortably and slipped into a jeans pocket and almost forgotten, unlike a big-screen device however thin. There was praise for the ability to listen to music and charge the phone at the same time.

The Next Web described Apple's iPhone SE as "the best looking phone it's ever made", citing the satin finish bead-blasted aluminum body and chamfered edges.

== See also ==
- List of iPhone models
- History of iPhone
- Timeline of iPhone models

Preceded by None	iPhone e/SE; 9th generation	Succeeded by iPhone SE (2nd)
