= IPhone 13 =

2021 smartphone by Apple

iPhone 13 iPhone 13 Mini

- iPhone 13 in Blue
- Developer: Apple
- Type: Smartphone
- Series: iPhone
- First released: September 24, 2021; 5 years ago
- Discontinued: 13 Mini: September 12, 2023; 3 years ago 13: September 9, 2024; 2 years ago
- Predecessor: iPhone 12 and 12 Mini
- Successor: iPhone 14 and 14 Plus
- Related: iPhone 13 Pro and Pro Max
- Compatible networks: GSM, CDMA, 3G, EVDO, HSPA+, 4G LTE, 5G
- Form factor: Slate
- Colors: Blue; Green; Midnight; Pink; Product Red; Starlight
- Dimensions: 13: H: 146.7 mm (5.78 in); W: 71.5 mm (2.81 in); D: 7.65 mm (0.301 in); 13 Mini: H: 131.5 mm (5.18 in); W: 64.2 mm (2.53 in); D: 7.65 mm (0.301 in)
- Weight: 13: 173–174 g (6.1–6.1 oz); 13 Mini: 140–141 g (4.9–5.0 oz)
- Operating system: Original: iOS 15; Current: iOS 27.2.1, released November 9, 2026
- System-on-chip: A15 Bionic
- CPU: Hexa-core (2x "high-performance" – 3.23 GHz, Avalanche + 4x "energy-saving" Blizzard) – 2.02 GHz
- GPU: Apple-designed 4 core, up to 1.37 TFLOPS
- Modem: Qualcomm Snapdragon X60 5G
- Memory: 4 GB LPDDR4X
- Storage: 128, 256 or 512 GB NVMe
- SIM: nanoSIM and eSIM (eSIM not available on China mainland models, and on Hong Kong and Macau iPhone 13 mini models) Single SIM or Dual SIM in dual stand-by
- Battery: 13: 3.84 V 12.41 W·h (3227 mA·h) Li-ion; 13 Mini: 3.88 V 9.34 W·h (2406 mA·h) Li-ion
- Charging: MagSafe and Qi wireless charging Lightning fast charging (20W)
- Rear camera: 12 MP, f/1.6, 26 mm (wide), 1.7 μm, dual pixel PDAF, sensor-shift OIS; 12 MP, f/2.4, 120°, 13 mm (ultrawide); Dual-LED dual-tone flash, HDR (photo/panorama); 4K@24/30/60fps, 1080p@30/60/120/240fps, HDR, Dolby Vision HDR (up to 60fps), stereo sound rec
- Front camera: 12 MP, f/2.2, 23 mm (wide), 1/3.6" SL 3D, (depth/biometrics sensor); HDR; 4K@24/25/30/60fps, 1080p@30/60/120fps, gyro-EIS
- Display: 13: 6.1 in (155 mm) diagonal Super Retina XDR OLED, 1170x2532px (460 ppi, 19.5:9 aspect ratio), supplied by LG Display,Samsung Display, and BOE; 13 Mini: 5.4 in (137 mm) diagonal Super Retina XDR OLED, 1080x2340 px (476 ppi, 19.5:9 aspect ratio), supplied by LG Display and Samsung Display
- Sound: Spatial Audio, Dolby Atmos, Dolby Audio
- Connectivity: Wi-Fi 6 (802.11ax), Bluetooth 5.0, Ultra-wideband (UWB); GPS, GLONASS, Galileo, QZSS, BeiDou
- Data inputs: List of inputs: Multi-touch touchscreen display; 3-mic configuration; Embedded motion coprocessor; 3-axis gyroscope; 3-axis accelerometer; iBeacon; Barometer; Digital compass; Proximity sensor; Ambient light sensor; Face ID facial recognition system
- Water resistance: IP68 IEC standard 60529 (splash, water, and dust resistant 6 meters (19.6 feet) for 30 min)
- Hearing aid compatibility: M3, T4
- Made in: China
- Other: FaceTime Audio or Video at 1080p over Wi-Fi and 5G, Voice over LTE
- Website: iPhone 13 at the Wayback Machine (archived April 30, 2022)

The iPhone 13 and iPhone 13 Mini (stylized as iPhone 13 mini) are smartphones that were developed and marketed by Apple. They are the fifteenth generation of iPhones, succeeding the iPhone 12 and 12 Mini. They were unveiled at an Apple Event in Apple Park in Cupertino, California, on September 14, 2021, alongside the higher-priced iPhone 13 Pro and iPhone 13 Pro Max flagships. They were later released on September 24, 2021. Notable improvements over the iPhone 12 include 128 GB of base storage, a maximum storage capacity of 512 GB, BeiDou positioning support, and HDR video recording at 60 frames per second, doubling the frame rate of its predecessor.

The iPhone 13 Mini was discontinued on September 12, 2023 without a successor, and the iPhone 13 was discontinued on September 9, 2024 with the announcement of the iPhone 16.

== Overview ==
The iPhone 13 and iPhone 13 Mini were officially announced alongside the ninth-generation iPad, 6th generation iPad Mini, Apple Watch Series 7, iPhone 13 Pro, and iPhone 13 Pro Max by a virtual press event filmed and recorded at Apple Park in Cupertino, California, on September 14, 2021. Pre-orders began on September 17, 2021, at 5:00 am PDT. Pricing started at US$799 for the iPhone 13 and US$699 for the iPhone 13 Mini.

Together with the iPhone 12, the iPhone 13 Mini was discontinued on September 12, 2023, with the announcement of the iPhone 15 and 15 Pro. The iPhone 13 continued to be sold until the announcement of the iPhone 16 and 16 Pro on September 9, 2024, when it was discontinued alongside the iPhone 15 Pro.

The iPhone 13 Mini was the final Mini iPhone offered by Apple due to a lack of demand for the Mini series, possibly in part because, just as thin, it also had a 25 percent smaller battery, at only a 12.5 percent discount. Despite the smaller display, the impact on usable video playback time was still about 10 percent (17 vs. 19 hours according to Apple's own comparison data).

== Design ==
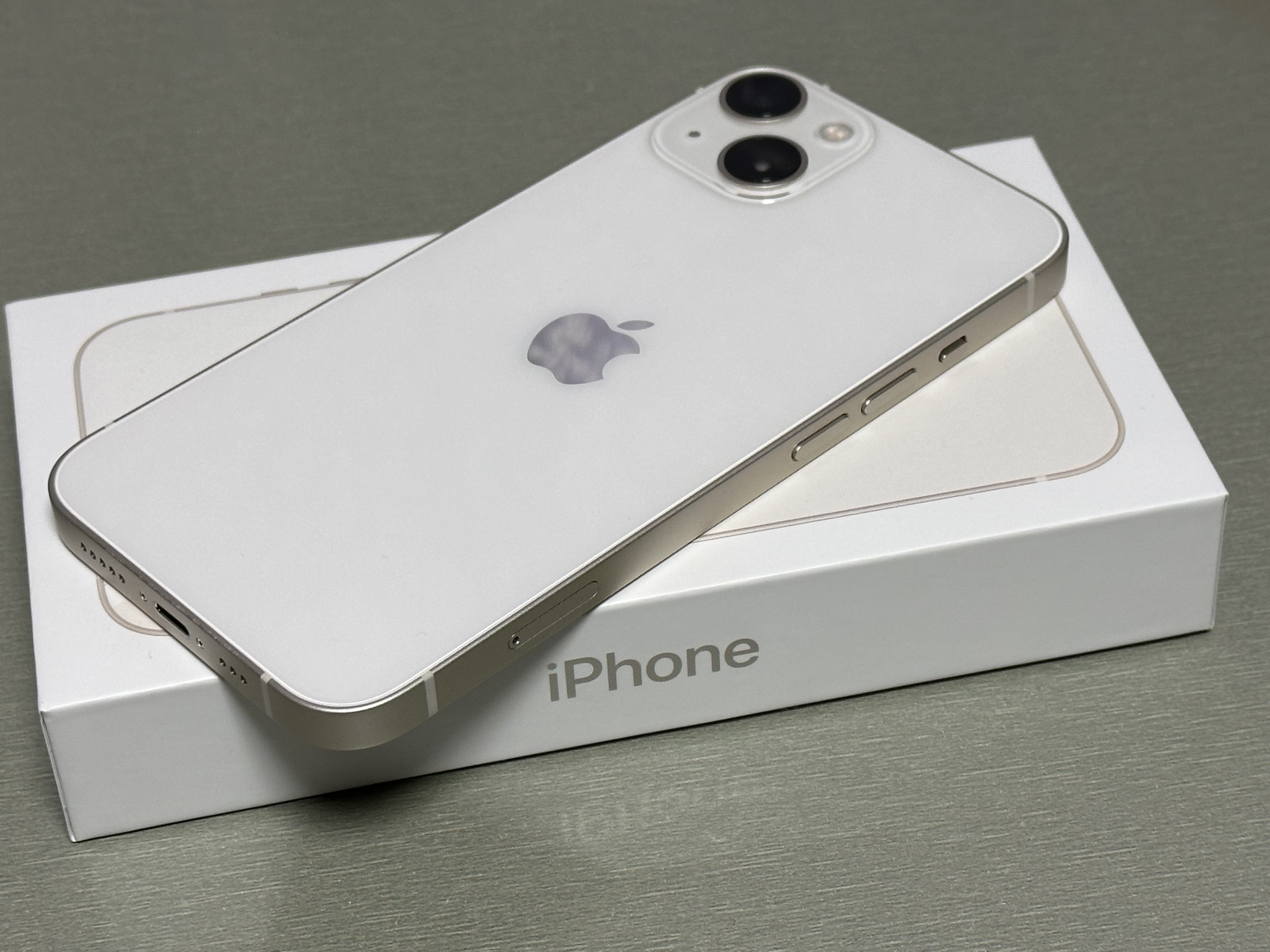
Backside view of a Starlight iPhone 13.

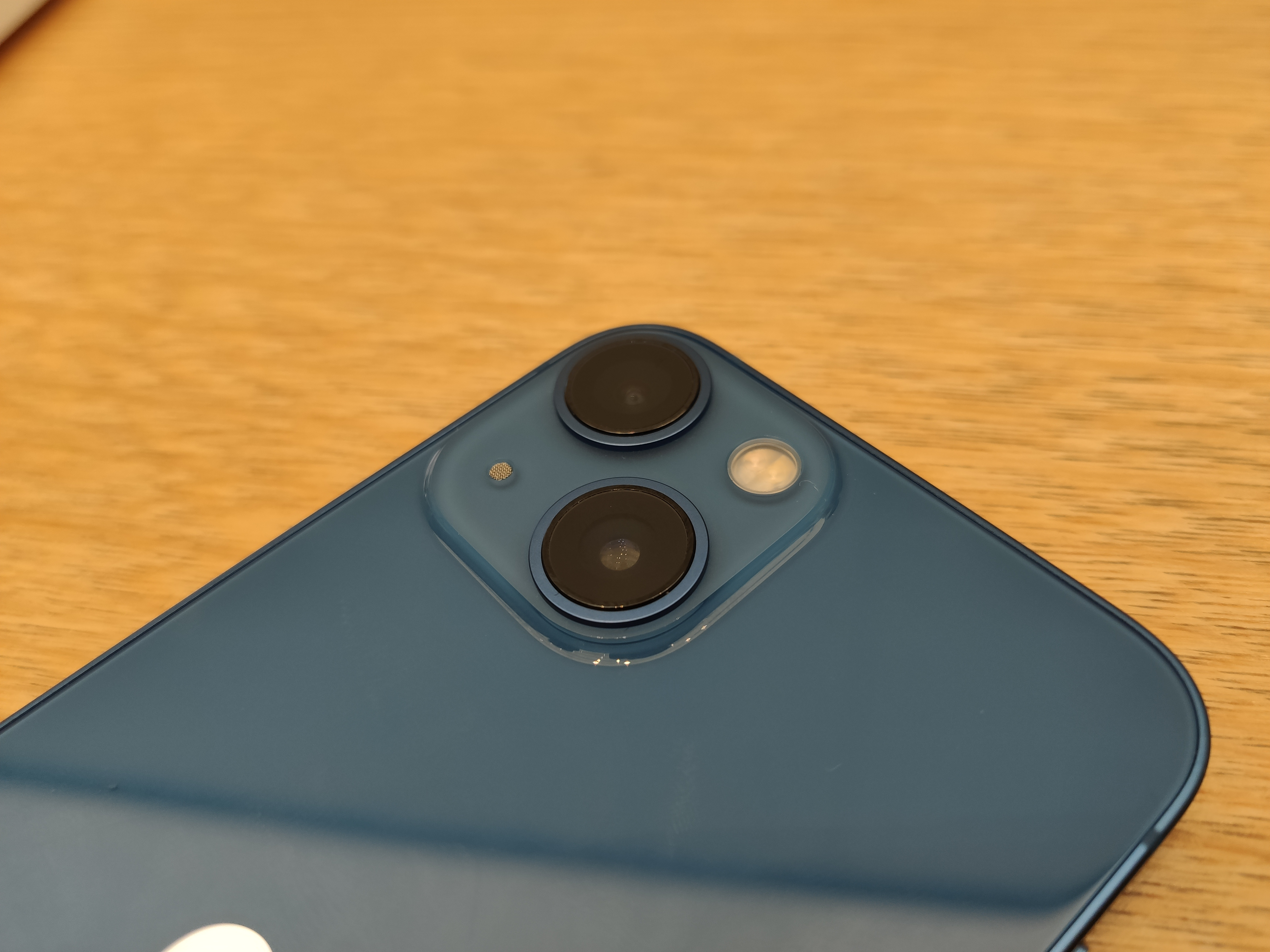
Up-close view of a Blue iPhone 13's diagonal camera arrangement.

The iPhone 13 has a flat chassis analogous to that of contemporaneous Apple products, with some differences such as the rear cameras being larger and arranged diagonally. The front speaker was moved above the notch allowing for the Face ID True Depth sensor housing on the iPhone to be 20% narrower, though it is slightly taller, than its predecessors.

The iPhone 13 and iPhone 13 Mini are available in six colors: Midnight, Starlight, Product Red, Blue, Pink, and Green.

On March 8, 2022, at Apple's Special Event, “Peek Performance”, Apple revealed a new Green color option, which was released on March 18, 2022.

Color	Name
	Midnight
	Starlight
	Product Red
	Blue
	Pink
	Green

== Specifications ==
=== Hardware ===
The iPhone 13 and iPhone 13 Mini use an Apple-designed A15 Bionic system on a chip. The iPhone 13 and 13 Mini feature a 6-core CPU, 4-core GPU, and 16-core Neural Engine, while the iPhone 13 Pro and 13 Pro Max feature a 5-core GPU.

==== Display ====
The iPhone 13 features a 6.1-inch (155 mm) display with Super Retina XDR OLED technology at a resolution of 1170×2532 pixels and a pixel density of about 460 PPI with a refresh rate of 60 Hz. The iPhone 13 Mini features a 5.4-inch (137 mm) display with the same technology at a resolution of 1080×2340 pixels and a pixel density of about 476 PPI. Both models have the Super Retina XDR OLED display with improved typical brightness up to 800 nits, and max brightness up to 1200 nits.

==== Cameras ====
The iPhone 13 and 13 Mini feature the same camera system with three cameras: one front-facing camera (12 MP f/2.2) and two back-facing cameras: a wide (12 MP f/1.6) and ultra-wide (12 MP f/2.4) camera. The back-facing cameras both contain larger sensors for more light-gathering, with new sensor shift optical image stabilization (OIS) on the main camera. The camera module on the back is arranged diagonally instead of vertically to engineer the larger sensors.

The cameras use Apple's latest computational photography engine, called Smart HDR 4. Users can also choose from a range of photographic styles during capture, including rich contrast, vibrant, warm, and cool. Apple clarifies this is different from a filter because it works intelligently with the image processing algorithm during capture to apply local adjustments to an image and the effects will be baked into the photos, unlike filters which can be removed after applying.

The camera app contains a new mode called Cinematic Mode, which allows users to rack focus between subjects and create (simulate) shallow depth of field using software algorithms. It is supported on wide and front-facing cameras in 1080p@30 fps.

==== Charging ====
The iPhone 13 and 13 Mini have Lightning fast charging at 20 Watts, and wireless charging via MagSafe at 15 W (iPhone 13) or 12 W (13 Mini), or via the Qi protocol at 7.5 W.

=== Software ===
Both the iPhone 13 and iPhone 13 Mini originally shipped with iOS 15 at launch. They later received iOS 16 which released on September 18 2022, then iOS 17 when it was made public on September 18 2023, then iOS 18 which released on September 16 2024, then iOS 26 when it became accessible on September 15 2026. They later received the iOS 27 update which was made publicly available on September 14 2026.

The next-generation Qi2 wireless charging standard was added to the iPhone 13 and iPhone 13 Mini with the iOS 17.2 update.

The iPhone 13 and 13 Mini are able to make calls via FaceTime Audio / Video (which is restricted in some regions), Voice over LTE (VoLTE), and Wi-Fi Calling. Wi-Fi hotspotting is also possible.

== Manufacturing ==
The iPhone 13 and 13 Mini were manufactured on contract by Pegatron and Foxconn for Apple.

== Release ==
=== Availability by country ===
September 24, 2021

- Australia
- Austria
- Belgium
- Canada
- China
- Czech Republic
- Denmark
- Egypt
- Finland
- France
- Germany
- Hong Kong
- Hungary
- Ireland
- India
- Italy
- Japan
- Luxembourg
- Malaysia
- Netherlands
- New Zealand
- Norway
- Poland
- Portugal
- Russia
- Singapore
- Sweden
- Switzerland
- Taiwan
- United Arab Emirates
- United Kingdom
- United States

October 1, 2021

- Brazil
- Turkey

October 8, 2021

- Mexico
- South Korea
- Thailand

October 22, 2021

- Israel

October 29, 2021

- Bangladesh
- Colombia
- Morocco
- Philippines
- Vietnam

November 19, 2021

- Indonesia

== Reception ==
TechRadar praised the iPhone 13 for its design, battery life, and powerful hardware, but criticized the absence of a 120 Hz display.

== Repairability and Battery Health ==
The iPhone 13 and 13 Mini are the last base-model iPhones to access the battery by lifting the front screen, which has been standard since the iPhone 5, as the iPhone 14 and later access the battery from the back by removing the back glass. However, Pro models such as the iPhone 14 Pro and iPhone 17 Pro continue to access the battery by lifting the front screen.

The iPhone 13 as well as the iPhone 14 and older models like the iPhone 12 do not support showing the cycle count, Manufacture Date, and First Use Date in the Battery Health & Charging section in Settings, as well as the native charge limit feature, as these are limited to the iPhone 15 and later. Only Optimized Battery Charging is supported, which does not function the same way as the charge limit feature, as the phone still charges to 100% normally.

Some iPhone 13 parts are paired to the motherboard. The user is warned if a paired component (e.g. screen, battery) is replaced by independent repair shops, the Face ID sensors may completely cease to function if replaced. On later iOS versions, Apple removed this limitation. Apple technicians have a proprietary software tool to pair components.

== See also ==
- History of the iPhone
- List of iPhone models

Preceded by iPhone 12 / 12 Mini	iPhone; 15th generation alongside iPhone 13 Pro / 13 Pro Max	Succeeded by iPhone 14 / 14 Plus
