= List of presentation programs =

The following is a list of notable presentation software.

== Free and open-source software ==
Title	Platform	Notes
Apache OpenOffice Impress	Linux, macOS, Windows	
Beamer	Unix-like, Windows	LaTeX document class for creating slides
Calligra Stage	Linux, Windows	Part of Calligra Suite
Collabora Online	Android, ChromeOS, iOS, iPadOS, Linux, macOS, Windows	Enterprise-ready online suite
LibreOffice Impress	Android, Linux, macOS, Windows; unofficial: ChromeOS, FreeBSD, Haiku, iOS, iPadOS, NetBSD, OpenBSD, Solaris	
Marp	Cross-platform	Markdown presentation ecosystem
OnlyOffice Desktop Editors	Android, iOS, macOS, Linux, Windows	
Powerdot	Cross-platform	LaTeX class for making presentations with PostScript
Spice-Up	Linux	Built for elementary OS
Presenton	Linux, macOS, Windows	

== Proprietary software ==
=== Commercial ===
Title	Platform	Notes
Apple Keynote	iOS, macOS	Part of iWork
Corel Presentations	Windows	Part of WordPerfect Office
Hancom Office	Android, iOS, macOS, Windows	Includes Hancom Show
Microsoft PowerPoint	macOS, Windows, Android, iOS	Part of Microsoft 365 / Office
Polaris Office	Android, iOS, macOS, Windows	
QuickOffice	Android, BlackBerry, iOS, Palm, Symbian, webOS	Acquired by Google; discontinued
SoftMaker Presentations	Android, iOS, Linux, macOS, Windows	Part of SoftMaker Office
WPS Office Presentation	Android, iOS, Fire OS, Linux, Windows	Commercial edition
Zoho Show	Web application, Android, iOS	Part of the Zoho Office Suite

=== Freeware ===
Title	Platform	Notes
Atlantis Nova	Windows	
Baraha	Windows	
Bean	Mac OS X	
NCH ExpressPoints	Windows	By NCH Software
SoftMaker Presentations	Android, iOS, Linux, macOS, Windows	Free edition (FreeOffice Presentations)
WPS Office Presentation	Android, Fire OS, HarmonyOS, iOS, Linux, Windows	Personal Edition

=== Online ===
Title	Platform	Notes
Apple Keynote	Web application	Available via iCloud
Brainshark	Web application	Cloud-based business presentations
Canva	Web application, Android, iOS, macOS, Windows	Graphic design and presentation tool
Google Slides	Web application, Android, iOS, ChromeOS	Part of Google Workspace
Hancom Office Show	Web application	Cloud version
Mentimeter	Web application	Interactive presentation software
Microsoft PowerPoint Online	Web application	Free online version
Microsoft Sway	Web application, Windows	Web presentation and storytelling app
OnlyOffice	Web application	Web presentation editor
Prezi	Web application, macOS, Windows	Non-linear zooming user interface
Showcase Workshop	Web application, iOS, Android, Windows	Sales presentation platform
SlideShare	Web application	Slide hosting and sharing service
Wooclap	Web application	Interactive platform with live questions

== Historical ==
Title	Platform	Notes
Adobe Persuasion	Classic Mac OS, Windows	Discontinued in 2000; succeeded by InDesign
AppleWorks	Classic Mac OS, Mac OS X, Windows 2000 or later	Formerly ClarisWorks presentation editing
CA-Cricket Presents	Apple Macintosh, Windows	Originally Cricket Software, later Computer Associates
Gobe Productive	BeOS, Linux, Windows	Integrated office suite
Harvard Graphics	DOS, Windows	Major market leader in the late 1980s and early 1990s
IBM Lotus Symphony	Linux, Mac OS X, Windows	Discontinued office suite based on OpenOffice.org
Lotus Freelance Graphics	Windows, OS/2	Part of Lotus SmartSuite
IBM Storyboard Plus	DOS	Early multimedia and slide-show software
Jarte	Windows	Discontinued
MagicPoint	Unix-like	X11-based presentation tool
NeoOffice	macOS	Fork of OpenOffice/LibreOffice; discontinued in 2024
Microsoft PowerPoint Viewer	Windows	Standalone viewer; discontinued in 2018
SlideRocket	Web application	Acquired by VMware, later ClearSlide; shut down in 2013

== See also ==
- Presentation program
- List of office suites
- Comparison of office suites
- Online office suite
