= Showcase Workshop =

- Developer: Showcase Software Ltd
- Release: 2012; 14 years ago
- Written in: Python, JavaScript, Objective-C, C++
- Operating system: Android, iOS, OS X, Windows Surface, Web-based platform
- Type: Presentation software, Mobile sales enablement systems
- Website: showcaseworkshop.com

Showcase Workshop, also referred to as Showcase, is a SaaS company that develops a presentation-building application for business use. Users upload files and images to a web platform which generates presentations viewable on a suite of mobile apps.

Showcase was founded in 2011. The company’s headquarters are in Wellington, New Zealand.

== History ==
Showcase Workshop was originally developed in response to dynamically changing content being presented on iPads at the 2012 Olympics.

After market-testing a beta version of the core application, Showcase Workshop launched commercially in 2012.

In 2014 Showcase partnered with Vodafone Global Enterprise.

== Product ==
Users upload pre-existing PDFs, videos, images and Microsoft Office documents to a secure server, building presentations or ‘showcases’ which can then be downloaded via the mobile apps. The presentations are used for mobile sales enablement, training, or operational/health and safety purposes.

== Reception ==
Reviewers have praised the ease of use of Showcase, calling it a “better alternative to developing a native app” and “intuitive”.

Criticisms include the lack of differing templates and a lack of complex customisation controls.

Showcase was nominated for a Tabby Award in 2014 and won a Tabby Award in 2015 for its Windows app.

== See also ==
- Prezi
- PowerPoint
