= Brainshark =

Technology company in USA

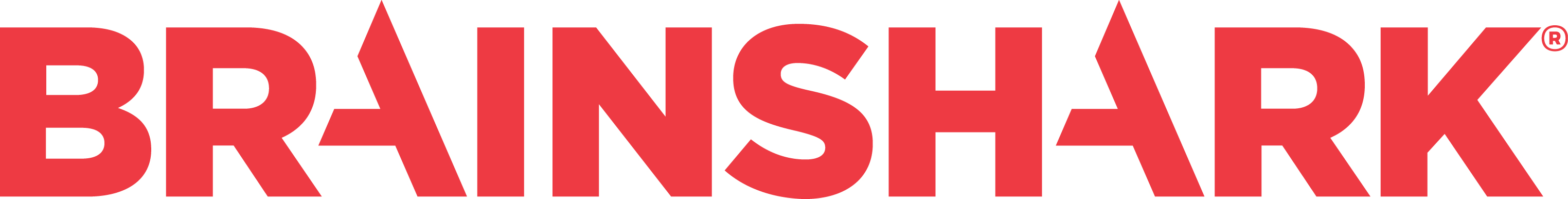
- Type: Private
- Founded: 1999
- Founders: Joe Gustafson
- Fate: Acquired by Bigtincan (2021)
- Headquarters: Waltham, MA, USA
- Key people: Greg Flynn, President and CEO Joe Gustafson, Founder & Chairman
- Website: www.brainshark.com

Brainshark was a privately held technology company based in Waltham, Massachusetts that provided a sales enablement platform and product suite. Bigtincan acquired Brainshark in August 2021.

== Products ==
Brainshark provided Web-based applications and products, delivered via software as a service (SaaS), to help companies improve sales effectiveness and productivity. The company offered a sales enablement platform and product suite.

The company's core product was Brainshark, a sales enablement platform that helped organizations create content used for sales training, onboarding, and coaching.

Brainshark launched its coaching platform in February 2016

In October 2011, Brainshark released SlideShark, a mobile app for the Apple iPad and Apple iPhone that lets users properly display PowerPoint presentations on iOS devices.

Brainshark was used in a wide range of industries, including insurance, healthcare, financial services, technology, non-profit, and others for training, sales and marketing, channel, and corporate communications.
