= Wooclap =

Virtual learning environment

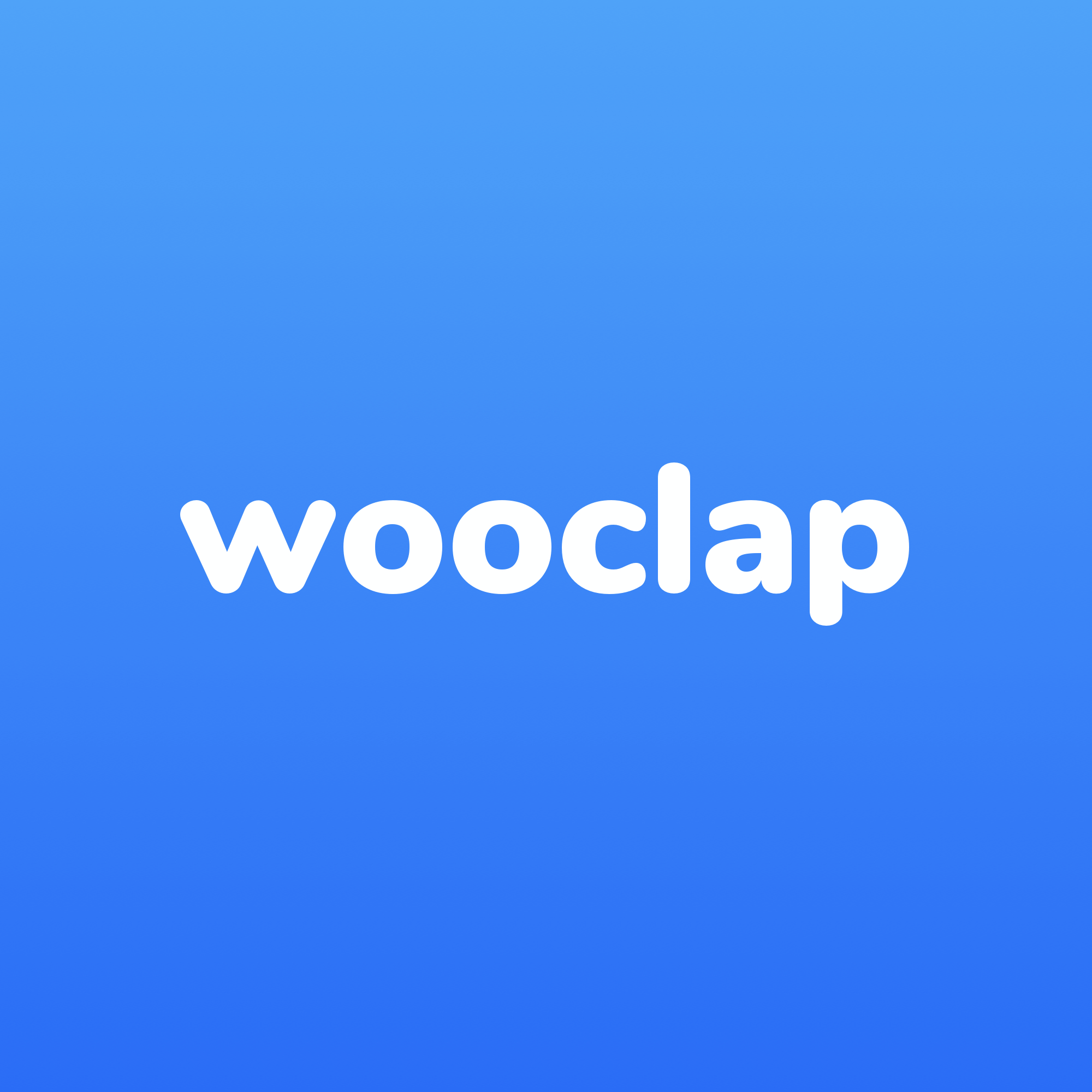
- Developers: Sebastien Lebbe; Jonathan Alzetta
- Release: 2015
- Available in: FR, EN, DE, NL, ES, IT
- Type: Educational technology
- Website: www.wooclap.com

Wooclap is a Belgian company that develops educational tools.

== History ==
Launched in 2015, Wooclap was founded by Jonathan Alzetta and Sébastien Lebbe, engineers from the École Polytechnique in Brussels. Initially self-funded, the company raised €350,000 in 2017 to support its development.

By December of 2021, Wooclap had reached 1 million users, primarily consisting of teachers and trainers. In 2023, Wooclap integrated artificial intelligence features, which can be used to create various questions and polls.

== Research ==
Since its launch in 2015, Wooclap has been studied by researchers for its effectiveness.

=== Lille University study ===
In a 2019 study, Lille University examined the effectiveness of Wooclap in medical education. The study concluded that students preferred Wooclap over traditional solutions, although it noted that Socrative, a similar tool, was similarly preferred by students. However, Wooclap was criticized for being the "most expensive" and "very limited" for its free tier. It also pointed to the fact that e-learning tools in general do not make it as easy to ask questions as a traditional lesson.
