= Mobile sales enablement =

Mobile sales enablement is a systematic approach to helping sales representatives prepare for in-person and remote prospect interactions, engage effectively with their audience using mobile devices, and close deals faster. Mobile sales enablement is part of the larger sales enablement process. There are many ways that organizations use mobile devices to functionally enhance the sales process. Behaviors completed on a mobile device may include but are not limited to the use of specialized applications, distribution of dynamic content, mobile email tactics or messaging such as push notifications, etc.

== Origin ==
Mobile sales enablement is an extension of the long-standing sales enablement strategy. IDC defines sales enablement as: “Getting the right information into the hands of the right seller at the right time and place, and in the right format, to move a sales opportunity forward”.

When the first iPad was released, some entrepreneurs took the opportunity to develop mobile apps that enabled salesmen to sell everywhere.

These were initiated out of costly custom agency builds that were difficult to maintain. As technology progressed, standardized apps were developed. Some apps focus on content distribution others are focused on more transactional functions.

The definition does not, and should not, define the strategies, tactics, or technologies used to accomplish it. It is a vendor-neutral approach that focuses upon the alignment of sales with marketing, customer success, finance, and product organizations.

== Devices ==
Mobile sales enablement can be applied to all mobile devices. This often includes tablets and smartphones. However; the downside of smartphones is the smaller screen size, in comparison with a tablet which has a larger screen for sharing presentations or materials to an audience. Good apps will tailor the benefits of the solution to the specific selling behavior for the devices.
