= CA-Cricket Presents =

Presentation software program

CA-Cricket Presents (formerly Xerox Presents originally from Xerox Desktop Software) was a presentation program developed for Apple Macintosh and Microsoft Windows by Cricket Software.

Cricket Software was later acquired by Computer Associates. CA-Cricket Graph was an associated chart program. The program competed with PowerPoint.

Presentation files used the filename extension .cpp while .cpt was used by template files.
