= List of iPhone models =

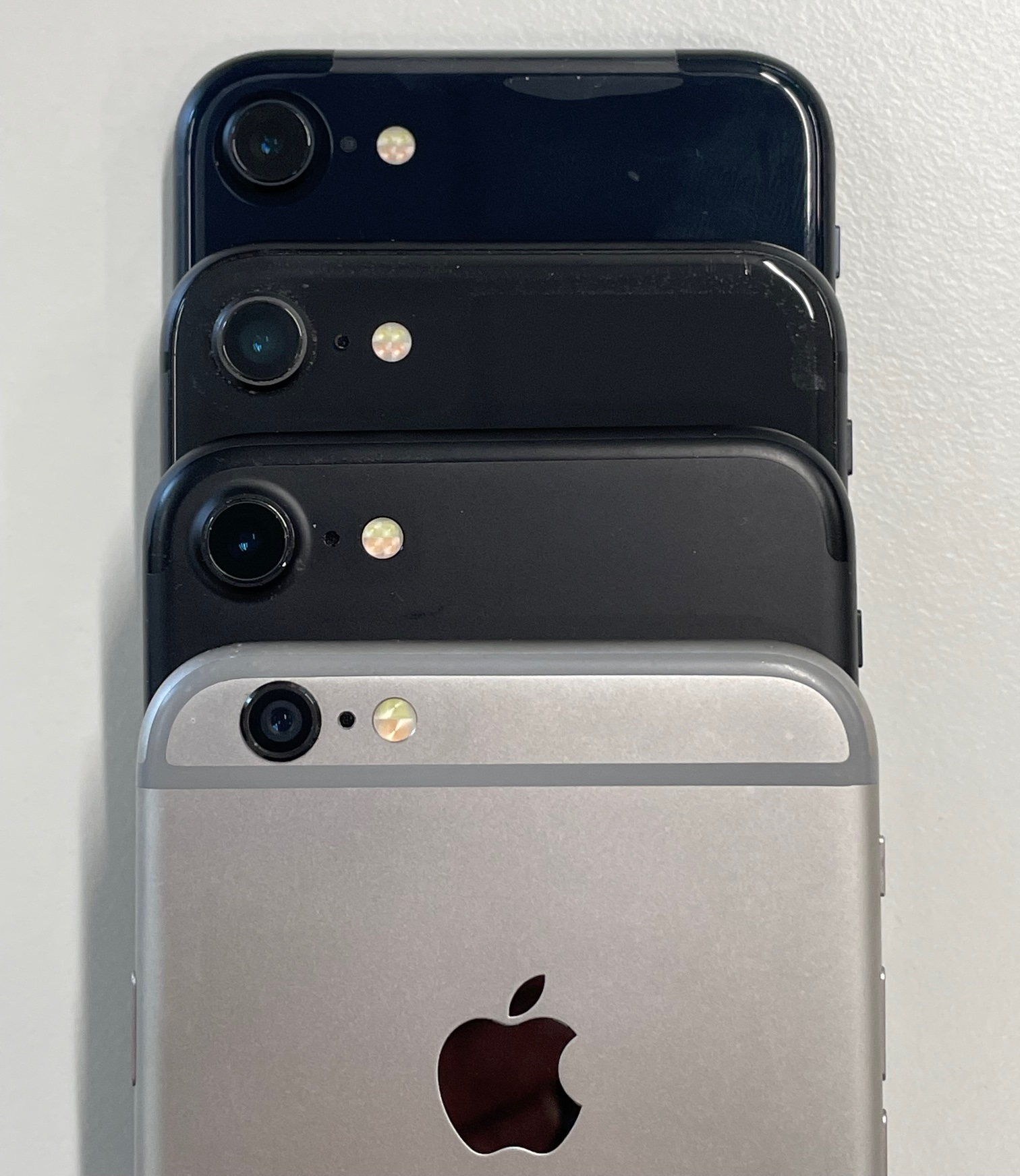
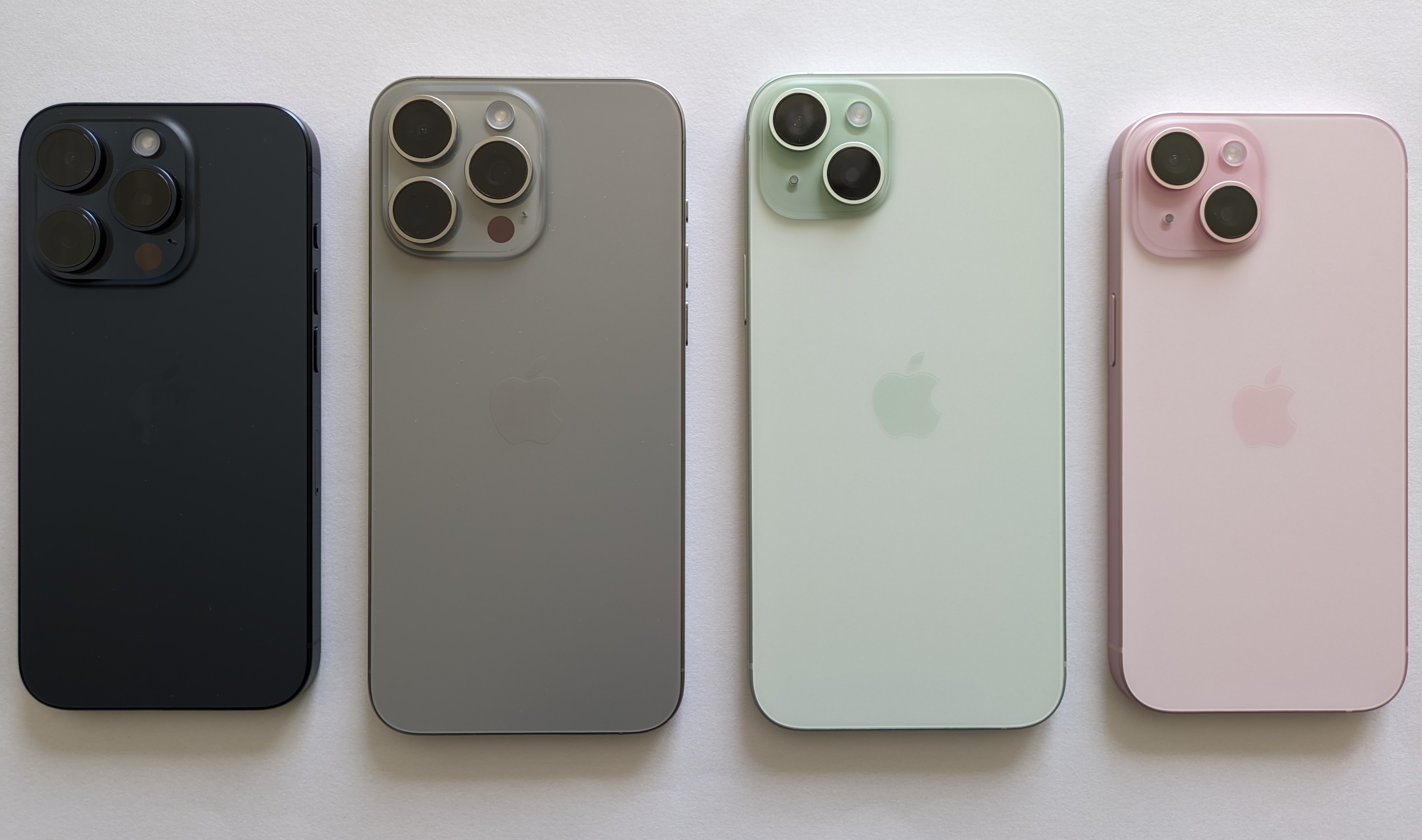
Left image, top to bottom: The backs of an iPhone SE (3rd generation), iPhone 8, iPhone 7, and iPhone 6. Right image, left to right: The backs of an iPhone 15 Pro, iPhone 15 Pro Max, iPhone 15 Plus, and iPhone 15.

The iPhone is a line of smartphones developed by Apple that use the iOS operating system. Introduced by then-CEO Steve Jobs on January 9, 2007, the iPhone revolutionized the mobile phone industry with its multi-touch interface and lack of physical keyboard. Over the years, Apple has released numerous models, each iteration bringing changes in hardware, software, performance, and design.

As of September 2026, the most recent iPhone models are the iPhone 18 Pro, iPhone 18 Pro Max and iPhone Duo announced on September 9, 2026.

== Comparison of models ==
=== Overview ===
Availability and support lifespan of all iPhone models
Model	Announced	Release(d)		Discontinued	Support		
Model	Announced	With OS	Date	Discontinued	Latest OS	Ended	Lifespan (Note: The duration of software support, from the initial release date to the date of the latest/final software update for the device.)
iPhone	January 9, 2007	iPhone OS 1.0	June 29, 2007	July 11, 2008	iPhone OS 3.1.3	February 2, 2010	2 years, 7 months
iPhone 3G	June 9, 2008	iPhone OS 2.0	July 11, 2008	June 7, 2010	iOS 4.2.1	November 22, 2010	3 years, 4 months
iPhone 3GS	June 8, 2009	iPhone OS 3.0	June 19, 2009	September 12, 2012	iOS 6.1.6	February 21, 2014	4 years, 8 months
iPhone 4	June 7, 2010	iOS 4.0	June 24, 2010; February 11, 2011 (CDMA model)	September 10, 2013	iOS 7.1.2	June 30, 2014	4 years, 2 months 3 years, 7 months (CDMA model)
iPhone 4s	October 4, 2011	iOS 5.0	October 14, 2011	September 9, 2014	iOS 9.3.6	July 22, 2019	7 years, 9 months
iPhone 5	September 12, 2012	iOS 6.0	September 21, 2012	September 10, 2013	iOS 10.3.4	July 22, 2019	6 years, 10 months
iPhone 5c	September 10, 2013	iOS 7.0	September 20, 2013	September 9, 2015	iOS 10.3.3	September 19, 2017	3 years, 11 months
iPhone 5s	September 10, 2013	iOS 7.0	September 20, 2013	March 21, 2016	iOS 12.5.8	January 26, 2026	12 years, 4 months
iPhone 6 / 6 Plus	September 9, 2014	iOS 8.0	September 19, 2014; March 10, 2017 (32 GB model)	September 7, 2016; September 12, 2018 (32 GB model)	iOS 12.5.8	January 26, 2026	11 years, 4 months 8 years, 10 months (32 GB model)
iPhone 6s / 6s Plus	September 9, 2015	iOS 9.0	September 25, 2015	September 12, 2018	iOS 15.8.8	May 11, 2026	10 years, 7 months
iPhone SE (1st)	March 21, 2016	iOS 9.3	March 31, 2016	September 12, 2018	iOS 15.8.8	May 11, 2026	10 years, 1 month
iPhone 7 / 7 Plus	September 7, 2016	iOS 10.0	September 16, 2016	September 10, 2019	iOS 15.8.8	May 11, 2026	9 years, 7 months
iPhone 8 / 8 Plus	September 12, 2017	iOS 11.0	September 22, 2017	April 15, 2020	iOS 16.7.16	May 11, 2026	8 years, 7 months
iPhone X	September 12, 2017	iOS 11.0.1	November 3, 2017	September 12, 2018	iOS 16.7.16	May 11, 2026	8 years, 6 months
iPhone XS / XS Max	September 12, 2018	iOS 12.0	September 21, 2018	September 10, 2019	iOS 18.7.12	November 9, 2026	8 years, 1 month
iPhone XR	September 12, 2018	iOS 12.0	October 26, 2018	September 14, 2021	iOS 18.7.12	November 9, 2026	8 years
iPhone 11	September 10, 2019	iOS 13.0	September 20, 2019	September 7, 2022	Latest iOS iOS 27.2.1	Supported	7 years, 1 month (ongoing)
iPhone 11 Pro / 11 Pro Max	September 10, 2019	iOS 13.0	September 20, 2019	October 13, 2020	Latest iOS iOS 27.2.1	Supported	7 years, 1 month (ongoing)
iPhone SE (2nd)	April 15, 2020	iOS 13.4	April 24, 2020	March 8, 2022	Latest iOS iOS 27.2.1	Supported	6 years, 6 months (ongoing)
iPhone 12 / 12 mini	October 13, 2020	iOS 14.1 (12) iOS 14.2 (12 mini)	October 23, 2020 (12); November 13, 2020 (12 mini)	September 7, 2022 (12 mini); September 12, 2023 (12)	Latest iOS iOS 27.2.1	Supported	6 years (12); 6 years (12 mini) (ongoing)
iPhone 12 Pro / 12 Pro Max	October 13, 2020	iOS 14.1 (12 Pro) iOS 14.2 (12 Pro Max)	October 23, 2020 (12 Pro); November 13, 2020 (12 Pro Max)	September 14, 2021	Latest iOS iOS 27.2.1	Supported	6 years (12 Pro); 6 years (12 Pro Max) (ongoing)
iPhone 13 / 13 mini	September 14, 2021	iOS 15.0	September 24, 2021	September 12, 2023 (13 mini); September 9, 2024 (13)	Latest iOS iOS 27.2.1	Supported	5 years, 1 month (ongoing)
iPhone 13 Pro / 13 Pro Max	September 14, 2021	iOS 15.0	September 24, 2021	September 7, 2022	Latest iOS iOS 27.2.1	Supported	5 years, 1 month (ongoing)
iPhone SE (3rd)	March 8, 2022	iOS 15.4	March 18, 2022	December 27, 2024 (EEA); February 19, 2025 (Outside EEA)	Latest iOS iOS 27.2.1	Supported	4 years, 8 months (ongoing)
iPhone 14 / 14 Plus	September 7, 2022	iOS 16.0	September 16, 2022 (14); October 7, 2022 (14 Plus)	December 27, 2024 (EEA); February 19, 2025 (Outside EEA)	Latest iOS iOS 27.2.1	Supported	4 years, 2 months (14); 4 years, 1 month (14 Plus) (ongoing)
iPhone 14 Pro / 14 Pro Max	September 7, 2022	iOS 16.0	September 16, 2022	September 12, 2023	Latest iOS iOS 27.2.1	Supported	4 years, 2 months (ongoing)
iPhone 15 / 15 Plus	September 12, 2023	iOS 17.0	September 22, 2023	September 9, 2025	Latest iOS iOS 27.2.1	Supported	3 years, 1 month (ongoing)
iPhone 15 Pro / 15 Pro Max	September 12, 2023	iOS 17.0	September 22, 2023	September 9, 2024	Latest iOS iOS 27.2.1	Supported	3 years, 1 month (ongoing)
iPhone 16 / 16 Plus	September 9, 2024	iOS 18.0	September 20, 2024	September 9, 2026 (16 Plus)	Latest iOS iOS 27.2.1	Supported	2 years, 1 month (ongoing)
iPhone 16 Pro / 16 Pro Max	September 9, 2024	iOS 18.0	September 20, 2024	September 9, 2025	Latest iOS iOS 27.2.1	Supported	2 years, 1 month (ongoing)
iPhone 16e	February 19, 2025	iOS 18.3	February 28, 2025	March 2, 2026	Latest iOS iOS 27.2.1	Supported	1 year, 8 months (ongoing)
iPhone 17	September 9, 2025	iOS 26.0	September 19, 2025	In production	Latest iOS iOS 27.2.1	Supported	1 year, 1 month (ongoing)
iPhone Air	September 9, 2025	iOS 26.0	September 19, 2025	In production	Latest iOS iOS 27.2.1	Supported	1 year, 1 month (ongoing)
iPhone 17 Pro / 17 Pro Max	September 9, 2025	iOS 26.0	September 19, 2025	September 9, 2026	Latest iOS iOS 27.2.1	Supported	1 year, 1 month (ongoing)
iPhone 17e	March 2, 2026	iOS 26.3	March 11, 2026	In production	Latest iOS iOS 27.2.1	Supported	8 months (ongoing)
iPhone 18 Pro / 18 Pro Max	September 9, 2026	iOS 27.0	September 18, 2026	In production	Latest iOS iOS 27.2.1	Supported	2 months (ongoing)
iPhone Duo	September 9, 2026	iOS 27.1	October 23, 2026	In production	Latest iOS iOS 27.2.1	Supported	0 months (ongoing)
Legend: / Discontinued and unsupported / Discontinued but supported / Current / Upcoming

=== Supporting latest iOS version ===
==== With Apple Intelligence ====
Apple Intelligence was introduced in 2024.

Model			iPhone Duo	iPhone 18 Pro Max	iPhone 18 Pro	iPhone 17e	iPhone 17 Pro Max	iPhone 17 Pro	iPhone Air	iPhone 17	iPhone 16e	iPhone 16 Pro Max	iPhone 16 Pro	iPhone 16 Plus	iPhone 16	iPhone 15 Pro Max	iPhone 15 Pro
Picture																	
Basic Info	Hardware Strings		iPhone19,4	iPhone19,3 iPhone19,7	iPhone19,2	iPhone18,5	iPhone18,2	iPhone18,1	iPhone18,4	iPhone18,3	iPhone17,5	iPhone17,2	iPhone17,1	iPhone17,4	iPhone17,3	iPhone16,2	iPhone16,1
Basic Info	Model number		A3447; A3719; A3720; A3721	A3473; A3716; A3717; A3718	A3472; A3713; A3714; A3715	A3575; A3634; A3635	A3257; A3525; A3526; A3527	A3256; A3522; A3523; A3524	A3260; A3516; A3517; A3518	A3258; A3519; A3520; A3521	A3212; A3408; A3409; A3410	A3084; A3295; A3296; A3297	A3083; A3292; A3293; A3294	A3082; A3289; A3290; A3291	A3081; A3286; A3287; A3288	A2849; A3105; A3106; A3108	A2848; A3101; A3102; A3104
Basic Info	Date	Announced	September 9, 2026			March 2, 2026	September 9, 2025				February 19, 2025	September 9, 2024				September 12, 2023	
Basic Info	Date	Released	October 23, 2026	September 18, 2026		March 11, 2026	September 19, 2025				February 28, 2025	September 20, 2024				September 22, 2023	
Basic Info	Date	Discontinued	In production				September 9, 2026		In production		March 2, 2026	September 9, 2025		128 GB and 256 GB: September 9, 2026; 512 GB: September 9, 2025	128 GB: In production 256 GB and 512 GB: September 9, 2025	September 9, 2024	
Basic Info	Date	Unsupported	Supported														
Basic Info	Operating System	Initial	iOS 27.1	iOS 27.0		iOS 26.3	iOS 26.0				iOS 18.3	iOS 18.0				iOS 17.0	
Basic Info	Operating System	Latest	iOS 27.2.1			iOS 27.2.1					iOS 27.2.1	iOS 27.2.1				iOS 27.2.1	
Colors																	
Materials	Front		Ceramic Shield 2 front								Ceramic Shield front						
Materials	Back		Ceramic Shield back	Aluminum unibody with Ceramic Shield back		Glass back	Aluminum unibody with Ceramic Shield back		Ceramic Shield back	Color-infused glass back (Lavender, Sage, Mist Blue, Black); Glass back (White)	Glass back	Textured matte glass back		Color-infused glass back (Black, Pink, Teal, Ultramarine); Glass back (White)		Textured matte glass back	
Materials	Side		Titanium sides	Aluminum unibody		Aluminum sides	Aluminum unibody		Titanium sides	Aluminum sides		Titanium sides		Aluminum sides		Titanium sides	
Resistant			IP68 (Maximum depth of 6 meters up to 30 minutes)														
Secure Authentication	Touch ID		Yes	No													
Secure Authentication	Face ID		No	Yes													
Buttons	Action Button		No	Yes													
Buttons	Camera Control		Yes			No	Yes				No	Yes				No	
Dimensions	Height		117.8 mm (4.64 in)	163.4 mm (6.43 in)	150.0 mm (5.91 in)	146.7 mm (5.78 in)	163.4 mm (6.43 in)	150.0 mm (5.91 in)	156.2 mm (6.15 in)	149.6 mm (5.89 in)	146.7 mm (5.78 in)	163 mm (6.4 in)	149.6 mm (5.89 in)	160.9 mm (6.33 in)	147.6 mm (5.81 in)	159.9 mm (6.30 in)	146.6 mm (5.77 in)
Dimensions	Width		164.6 mm (6.48 in) open, 84.1 mm (3.31 in) closed	78.0 mm (3.07 in)	71.9 mm (2.83 in)	71.5 mm (2.81 in)	78.0 mm (3.07 in)	71.9 mm (2.83 in)	74.7 mm (2.94 in)	71.5 mm (2.81 in)		77.6 mm (3.06 in)	71.5 mm (2.81 in)	77.8 mm (3.06 in)	71.6 mm (2.82 in)	76.7 mm (3.02 in)	70.6 mm (2.78 in)
Dimensions	Depth		5.2 mm (0.20 in) open, 11.3 mm (0.44 in) closed	8.75 mm (0.34 in)		7.8 mm (0.31 in)	8.75 mm (0.34 in)		5.64 mm (0.222 in)	7.95 mm (0.313 in)	7.8 mm (0.31 in)	8.25 mm (0.32 in)		7.8 mm (0.31 in)		8.25 mm (0.32 in)	
Dimensions	Weight		254 g (9.0 oz)	249 g (8.8 oz)	211 g (7.4 oz)	169 g (6.0 oz)	231 g (8.1 oz)	204 g (7.2 oz)	165 g (5.8 oz)	177 g (6.2 oz)	167 g (5.9 oz)	227 g (8.0 oz)	199 g (7.0 oz)		170 g (6.0 oz)	221 g (7.8 oz)	187 g (6.6 oz)
Display	Size	Diagonal	7.58 in (193 mm) inner display, 5.36 in (136 mm) outer display	6.86 in (174 mm)	6.27 in (159 mm)	6.06 in (154 mm)	6.86 in (174 mm)	6.27 in (159 mm)	6.55 in (166 mm)	6.27 in (159 mm)	6.06 in (154 mm)	6.86 in (174 mm)	6.27 in (159 mm)	6.69 in (170 mm)	6.12 in (155 mm)	6.69 in (170 mm)	6.12 in (155 mm)
Display	Size	Vertical-by-Horizontal	4.36 by 6.2 in (111 by 157 mm) inner, 4.42 by 3.04 in (112 by 77 mm) outer	6.23 by 2.87 in (158 by 73 mm)	5.7 by 2.62 in (145 by 67 mm)	5.5 by 2.54 in (140 by 65 mm)	6.23 by 2.87 in (158 by 73 mm)	5.7 by 2.62 in (145 by 67 mm)	5.95 by 2.74 in (151 by 70 mm)	5.7 by 2.62 in (145 by 67 mm)	5.5 by 2.54 in (140 by 65 mm)	6.23 by 2.87 in (158 by 73 mm)	5.7 by 2.62 in (145 by 67 mm)	6.07 by 2.8 in (154 by 71 mm)	5.56 by 2.56 in (141 by 65 mm)	6.07 by 2.8 in (154 by 71 mm)	5.56 by 2.56 in (141 by 65 mm)
Display	Resolution	Vertical-by-Horizontal	1878 × 2670 inner display, 1398 × 2034 outer display	2868 × 1320	2622 × 1206	2532 × 1170	2868 × 1320	2622 × 1206	2736 × 1260	2622 × 1206	2532 × 1170	2868 × 1320	2622 × 1206	2796 × 1290	2556 × 1179	2796 × 1290	2556 × 1179
Display	Resolution	Density	430 ppi inner display, 460 ppi outer display	460 ppi													
Display	Resolution	Aspect Ratio	1.4:1 consistent with outer display	~19.5:9													
Display	Multi-touch		Yes														
Display	Technology		Super Retina XDR display all-screen OLED														
Display	Backlight		—N/a														
Display	Dynamic Island		Yes			No	Yes				No	Yes					
Display	Refresh Rate	Minimum	1 Hz			60 Hz	1 Hz				60 Hz	1 Hz		60 Hz		1 Hz	
Display	Refresh Rate	Maximum	120 Hz			60 Hz	120 Hz				60 Hz	120 Hz		60 Hz		120 Hz	
Display	Refresh Rate	ProMotion Display	Yes			No	Yes				No	Yes		No		Yes	
Display	Refresh Rate	Always-On Display	Yes			No	Yes				No	Yes		No		Yes	
Display	Brightness and Contrast	Typical Max brightness	1000 nits			800 nits	1000 nits				800 nits	1000 nits					
Display	Brightness and Contrast	HDR Max brightness	1600 nits			1200 nits	1600 nits				1200 nits	1600 nits					
Display	Brightness and Contrast	Outdoor Max brightness	3000 nits			—N/a	3000 nits				—N/a	2000 nits					
Display	Brightness and Contrast	Minimum brightness	1 nit			—N/a	1 nit				—N/a	1 nit				—N/a	
Display	Brightness and Contrast	Contrast ratio (typical)	2,000,000:1														
Display	Brightness and Contrast	HDR Display	Yes														
Display	Brightness and Contrast	HDR10 Content	Yes														
Display	Brightness and Contrast	Dolby Vision Content	With HDR			Yes	With HDR				Yes	With HDR					
Display	Color	Full sRGB	Yes														
Display	Color	Wide Color (P3)	Yes														
Display	Color	True Tone	Yes														
Display	Color	Night Shift	Yes														
Display	Fingerprint-resistant oleophobic coating		Yes														
Display	Anti-reflective coating		Yes								No						
Display	Taptic		Haptic Touch														
Performance	Cooling system	Vapor Chamber	Yes			No	Yes		No								
Performance	Chip	Chip Name	Apple A20 Pro			Apple A19	Apple A19 Pro			Apple A19	Apple A18	Apple A18 Pro		Apple A18		Apple A17 Pro	
Performance	Chip	Technology Node	2 nm (N2)			3 nm (N3P)					3 nm (N3E)					3 nm (N3B)	
Performance	Chip	Bit	64-bit														
Performance	Chip	Total Cores	6														
Performance	Chip	High-performance Cores	2 × 4.93 GHz			2 × 4.25 GHz					2 × 4.04 GHz					2 × 3.78 GHz	
Performance	Chip	Energy-efficiency Cores	4 × 2.60 GHz								4 × 2.42 GHz					4 × 2.11 GHz	
Performance	Chip	Graphics Processor	Apple G19P			Apple G18P					Apple G17P					Apple G16P	
Performance	Chip	Total GPU cores	7			4	6		5		4	6		5		6	
Performance	Chip	GPU Family	Apple GPU Family 11			Apple GPU Family 10					Apple GPU Family 9						
Performance	Chip	Hardware-accelerated Ray Tracing	Yes														
Performance	Chip	Neural Accelerators in GPU	Yes								No						
Performance	Chip	Neural Engine	Dual 16-core			16-core					16-core (35 TOPS INT8)						
Performance	Chip	Apple Intelligence	Yes														
Performance	Chip	Visual Intelligence	Through Camera Control			Through Action Button	Through Camera Control				Requires iOS 18.3 or later, through Action Button	Requires iOS 18.2 or later, through Camera Control				Requires iOS 18.4 or later, through Action Button	
Performance	RAM	RAM Size	12 GB			8 GB	12 GB			8 GB							
Performance	RAM	RAM Width	96-bit			64-bit											
Performance	RAM	RAM Type	LPDDR5X-9600 (4800 MHz)			LPDDR5X-8533 (4266 MHz)	LPDDR5X-9600 (4800 MHz)		LPDDR5X-8533 (4266 MHz)		LPDDR5X-7500 (3750 MHz)					LPDDR5-6400 (3200 MHz)	
Performance	RAM	RAM Bandwidth	115.2 GB/s			68.3 GB/s	75.8 GB/s		68.3 GB/s		60 GB/s					51.2 GB/s	
Performance	Storage	Storage Size	256 GB; 512 GB; 1 TB; 2 TB			256 GB; 512 GB	256 GB; 512 GB; 1 TB; 2 TB	256 GB; 512 GB; 1 TB		256 GB; 512 GB	128 GB; 256 GB; 512 GB	256 GB; 512 GB; 1 TB	128 GB; 256 GB; 512 GB; 1 TB	128 GB; 256 GB; 512 GB		256 GB; 512 GB; 1 TB	128 GB; 256 GB; 512 GB; 1 TB
Performance	Storage	Storage Type	NAND Flash driven by NVMe-based controller that communicates over a PCIe connection														
Connector	Connector Type		USB-C port supporting charging and DP video output			USB-C port supporting charging	USB-C port supporting charging and DP video output		USB-C port supporting charging	USB-C port supporting charging and DP video output	USB-C port supporting charging	USB-C port supporting charging and DP video output					
Connector	Data Transfer Speed		Up to 10 Gbit/s (USB 10Gbps)			Up to 0.48 Gbit/s (USB 2.0)	Up to 10 Gbit/s (USB 10Gbps)		Up to 0.48 Gbit/s (USB 2.0)			Up to 10 Gbit/s (USB 10Gbps)		Up to 0.48 Gbit/s (USB 2.0)		Up to 10 Gbit/s (USB 10Gbps)	
Connector	External Display Support		Up to 4K HDR			No	Up to 4K HDR		No	Up to 4K HDR	No	Up to 4K HDR					
Connectivity	Wi-Fi		Wi-Fi 7 (802.11a/b/g/n/ac/ax/be)			Wi-Fi 6 (802.11a/b/g/n/ac/ax)	Wi-Fi 7 (802.11a/b/g/n/ac/ax/be)				Wi-Fi 6 (802.11a/b/g/n/ac/ax)	Wi-Fi 7 (802.11a/b/g/n/ac/ax/be)				Wi-Fi 6E (802.11a/b/g/n/ac/ax)	
Connectivity	MIMO		Yes														
Connectivity	Bluetooth		Bluetooth 6.0			Bluetooth 5.3	Bluetooth 6.0				Bluetooth 5.3						
Connectivity	Thread networking technology		Yes			No	Yes				No	Yes					
Connectivity	NFC		With Reader Mode in background														
Connectivity	Express Cards		With Power Reserve														
Connectivity	Ultra Wideband Chip		Second-generation			No	Second-generation				No	Second-generation					
Connectivity	Cellular	Modem	Apple C2	Qualcomm Snapdragon X80 (U.S. models); Apple C2	Apple C2	Apple C1X	Qualcomm Snapdragon X80		Apple C1X	Qualcomm Snapdragon X80	Apple C1	Qualcomm Snapdragon X71				Qualcomm Snapdragon X70	
Connectivity	Cellular	GSM/EDGE	Yes														
Connectivity	Cellular	UMTS/HSPA+	Yes														
Connectivity	Cellular	DC-HSDPA	Yes			No	Yes		No	Yes	No	Yes					
Connectivity	Cellular	CDMA	No														
Connectivity	Cellular	4G/LTE	Gigabit LTE														
Connectivity	Cellular	5G	sub-6 GHz and mmWave (U.S. models)			sub-6 GHz	sub-6 GHz and mmWave (U.S. models)		sub-6 GHz	sub-6 GHz and mmWave (U.S. models)	sub-6 GHz	sub-6 GHz and mmWave (U.S. models)					
Connectivity	VoLTE		Yes														
Connectivity	SIM Card	Form-factor	No physical SIM card form-factor	Nano-SIM; No physical SIM card form-factor in U.S., Puerto Rico, Bahrain, Canada, Guam, Japan, Kuwait, Mexico, Oman, Qatar, Saudi Arabia, United Arab Emirates, and U.S. Virgin Islands models					No physical SIM card form-factor	Nano-SIM; No physical SIM card form-factor in U.S., Puerto Rico, Bahrain, Canada, Guam, Japan, Kuwait, Mexico, Oman, Qatar, Saudi Arabia, United Arab Emirates, and U.S. Virgin Islands models	Nano-SIM; No physical SIM card form-factor in U.S. models						
Connectivity	SIM Card	eSIM	Yes				Except Mainland China models		Yes	Except Mainland China models		Yes	Except Mainland China models		Except Mainland China, Hong Kong and Macau models		
Connectivity	SIM Card	Dual SIM	2 × eSIM	1 × Nano-SIM + 1 × eSIM or 2 × eSIM		2 × eSIM	1 × Nano-SIM + 1 × eSIM or 2 × eSIM		2 × eSIM	1 × Nano-SIM + 1 × eSIM or 2 × eSIM							
Connectivity	SIM Card	Dual SIM	2 × eSIM	1 × Nano-SIM + 1 × eSIM or 2 × eSIM or 2 × Nano-SIM in Mainland China models		2 × eSIM	2 × Nano-SIM in Mainland China models		2 × eSIM	2 × Nano-SIM in Mainland China models		2 × Nano-SIM in Mainland China, Hong Kong and Macau models					
Connectivity	GPS	GPS	Precision Dual-frequency			Yes	Precision Dual-frequency				Yes	Precision Dual-frequency		Yes		Precision Dual-frequency	
Connectivity	GPS	GLONASS/GNSS	Precision Dual-frequency			Yes	Precision Dual-frequency				Yes	Precision Dual-frequency		Yes		Precision Dual-frequency	
Connectivity	GPS	Galileo	Precision Dual-frequency			Yes	Precision Dual-frequency				Yes	Precision Dual-frequency		Yes		Precision Dual-frequency	
Connectivity	GPS	QZSS	Precision Dual-frequency			Yes	Precision Dual-frequency				Yes	Precision Dual-frequency		Yes		Precision Dual-frequency	
Connectivity	GPS	BeiDou	Precision Dual-frequency			Yes	Precision Dual-frequency				Yes	Precision Dual-frequency		Yes		Precision Dual-frequency	
Connectivity	GPS	NavIC	Precision Dual-frequency			Yes	Precision Dual-frequency				Yes	Precision Dual-frequency		No		Precision Dual-frequency	
Safety	Emergency SOS		Yes														
Safety	Emergency SOS Satellite		Selected regions only														
Safety	Crash Detection		Yes														
Sensors	LiDAR		No	Yes		No	Yes		No			Yes		No		Yes	
Sensors	Proximity Sensor		Yes														
Sensors	Gyro		High dynamic range gyro														
Sensors	Accelerometer		High-g accelerometer														
Sensors	Ambient Light Sensor		Four ambient light sensors	Dual ambient light sensor													
Sensors	Barometer		Yes														
Rear Camera	Camera	Resolution	48 MP Fusion Main with 12 MP 2x Telephoto; 48 MP Fusion Ultra Wide	48 MP Fusion Main with 12 MP 2x Telephoto; 48 MP Fusion Ultra Wide; 48 MP 4x Fusion Telephoto with 12 MP 8x Telephoto		48 MP Fusion Main with 12 MP 2x Telephoto	48 MP Fusion Main with 12 MP 2x Telephoto; 48 MP Fusion Ultra Wide; 48 MP 4x Fusion Telephoto with 12 MP 8x Telephoto		48 MP Fusion Main with 12 MP 2x Telephoto	48 MP Fusion Main with 12 MP 2x Telephoto; 48 MP Fusion Ultra Wide	48 MP Fusion Main with 12 MP 2x Telephoto	48 MP Fusion Main with 12 MP 2x Telephoto; 48 MP Ultra Wide; 12 MP 5x Telephoto		48 MP Fusion Main with 12 MP 2x Telephoto; 12 MP Ultra Wide		48 MP Main; 12 MP Ultra Wide; 12 MP 2x Telephoto (Enabled by Quad-pixel); 12 MP 5x Telephoto	48 MP Main; 12 MP Ultra Wide; 12 MP 2x Telephoto (Enabled by Quad-pixel); 12 MP 3x Telephoto
Rear Camera	Camera	Super High Resolution Support	24 MP (Default); 48 MP HEIF	24 MP (Default); 48 MP HEIF and 48 MP ProRAW		24 MP (Default); 48 MP HEIF	24 MP (Default); 48 MP HEIF and 48 MP ProRAW		24 MP (Default); 48 MP HEIF			24 MP (Default); 48 MP HEIF and 48 MP ProRAW		24 MP (Default); 48 MP HEIF		24 MP (Default); 48 MP HEIF and 48 MP ProRAW	
Rear Camera	Camera	Aperture	f/1.6 (Fusion Main) f/2.2 (Fusion Ultra Wide)	f/1.48, f/1.8, f/2.8, f/4.0 Variable Aperture (Fusion Main) f/2.2 (Fusion Ultra Wide) f/2.8 (Fusion Telephoto)		f/1.6	f/1.78 (Fusion Main) f/2.2 (Fusion Ultra Wide) f/2.8 (Fusion Telephoto)		f/1.6	f/1.6 (Fusion Main) f/2.2 (Fusion Ultra Wide)	f/1.6	f/1.78 (Fusion Main) f/2.2 (Ultra Wide) f/2.8 (5x Telephoto)		f/1.6 (Fusion Main) f/2.2 (Ultra Wide)		f/1.78 (Main and 2x Telephoto) f/2.2 (Ultra Wide) f/2.8 (5x Telephoto)	f/1.78 (Main and 2x Telephoto) f/2.2 (Ultra Wide) f/2.8 (3x Telephoto)
Rear Camera	Camera	Focal Length	13 mm (Fusion Ultra Wide); 26 mm (Fusion Main); 52 mm (2x Telephoto)	13 mm (Fusion Ultra Wide); 24 mm (Fusion Main); 48 mm (2x Telephoto); 100 mm (4x Fusion Telephoto); 200 mm (8x Fusion Telephoto)		26 mm (Fusion Main); 52 mm (2x Telephoto)	13 mm (Fusion Ultra Wide); 24 mm (Fusion Main); 48 mm (2x Telephoto); 100 mm (4x Fusion Telephoto); 200 mm (8x Fusion Telephoto)		26 mm (Fusion Main); 52 mm (2x Telephoto)	13 mm (Fusion Ultra Wide); 26 mm (Fusion Main); 52 mm (2x Telephoto)	26 mm (Fusion Main); 52 mm (2x Telephoto)	13 mm (Ultra Wide); 24 mm (Fusion Main); 48 mm (2x Telephoto); 120 mm (5x Telephoto)		13 mm (Ultra Wide); 26 mm (Fusion Main); 52 mm (2x Telephoto)		13 mm (Ultra Wide); 24 mm (Main); 48 mm (2x Telephoto); 120 mm (5x Telephoto)	13 mm (Ultra Wide); 24 mm (Main); 48 mm (2x Telephoto); 77 mm (3x Telephoto)
Rear Camera	Camera	Pixel Size	2 μm (Fusion Main, 12 MP); 1 μm (Fusion Main, 48 MP); 1 μm (2x Telephoto); 1.4 μm (Fusion Ultra Wide, 12 MP); 0.7 μm (Fusion Ultra Wide, 48 MP)	2.44 μm (Fusion Main, 12 MP); 1.22 μm (Fusion Main, 48 MP); 1.22 μm (2x Telephoto); 1.4 μm (Fusion Ultra Wide, 12 MP); 0.7 μm (Fusion Ultra Wide, 48 MP); 1.4 μm (4x Fusion Telephoto, 12 MP); 0.7 μm (4x Fusion Telephoto, 48 MP); 0.7 μm (8x Fusion Telephoto)		1.4 μm (Fusion Main, 12 MP); 0.7 μm (Fusion Main, 48 MP); 0.7 μm (2x Telephoto)	2.44 μm (Fusion Main, 12 MP); 1.22 μm (Fusion Main, 48 MP); 1.22 μm (2x Telephoto); 1.4 μm (Fusion Ultra Wide, 12 MP); 0.7 μm (Fusion Ultra Wide, 48 MP); 1.4 μm (4x Fusion Telephoto, 12 MP); 0.7 μm (4x Fusion Telephoto, 48 MP); 0.7 μm (8x Fusion Telephoto)		2 μm (Fusion Main, 12 MP); 1 μm (Fusion Main, 48 MP); 1 μm (2x Telephoto)	2 μm (Fusion Main, 12 MP); 1 μm (Fusion Main, 48 MP); 1 μm (2x Telephoto); 1.4 μm (Fusion Ultra Wide, 12 MP); 0.7 μm (Fusion Ultra Wide, 48 MP)	1.4 μm (Fusion Main, 12 MP); 0.7 μm (Fusion Main, 48 MP); 0.7 μm (2x Telephoto)	2.44 μm (Fusion Main, 12 MP); 1.22 μm (Fusion Main, 48 MP); 1.22 μm (2x Telephoto); 1.4 μm (Ultra Wide, 12 MP); 0.7 μm (Ultra Wide, 48 MP); 1.12 μm (5x Telephoto)		2 μm (Fusion Main, 12 MP); 1 μm (Fusion Main, 48 MP); 1 μm (2x Telephoto); 1.4 μm (Ultra Wide)		2.44 μm (Main, 12 MP); 1.22 μm (Main, 48 MP); 1.22 μm (2x Telephoto); 1.4 μm (Ultra Wide); 1.12 μm (5x Telephoto)	2.44 μm (Main, 12 MP); 1.22 μm (Main, 48 MP); 1.22 μm (2x Telephoto); 1.4 μm (Ultra Wide); 1 μm (3x Telephoto)
Rear Camera	Camera	Sensor Size	1/1.59" (Fusion Main); 1/2.55" (Fusion Ultra Wide)	1/1.28" (Fusion Main); 1/2.55" (Fusion Ultra Wide); 1/2.55" (Fusion Telephoto)		1/2.55"	1/1.28" (Fusion Main); 1/2.55" (Fusion Ultra Wide); 1/2.55" (Fusion Telephoto)		1/1.59"	1/1.59" (Fusion Main); 1/2.55" (Fusion Ultra Wide)	1/2.55"	1/1.28" (Fusion Main); 1/2.55" (Ultra Wide); 1/3.2" (5x Telephoto)		1/1.59" (Fusion Main); 1/2.55" (Ultra Wide)		1/1.28" (Main); 1/2.55" (Ultra Wide); 1/3.2" (5x Telephoto)	1/1.28" (Main); 1/2.55" (Ultra Wide); 1/3.4" (3x Telephoto)
Rear Camera	Camera	Optical Image Stabilization	Sensor-shift (Fusion Main)	Second-generation sensor-shift (Fusion Main); 3D sensor‑shift with tetraprism design (Fusion Telephoto)		Lens-shift	Second-generation sensor-shift (Fusion Main); 3D sensor‑shift with tetraprism design (Fusion Telephoto)		Sensor-shift	Sensor-shift (Fusion Main)	Lens-shift	Second-generation sensor-shift (Fusion Main); 3D sensor‑shift with tetraprism design (5x Telephoto)		Sensor-shift (Fusion Main)		Second-generation sensor-shift (Main and 2x Telephoto); 3D sensor‑shift with tetraprism design (5x Telephoto)	Second-generation sensor-shift (Main and 2x Telephoto); Lens-shift (3x Telephoto)
Rear Camera	Camera	Auto Image Stabilization	Yes														
Rear Camera	Camera	Element Lens	?									Seven-element lens (5x Telephoto)		?			
Rear Camera	Camera	Autofocus	Hybrid Focus Pixels (All cameras)	100% Focus Pixels (Fusion Main); Hybrid Focus Pixels (Fusion Ultra Wide and Fusion Telephoto)		Hybrid Focus Pixels	100% Focus Pixels (Fusion Main); Hybrid Focus Pixels (Fusion Ultra Wide and Fusion Telephoto)		100% Focus Pixels	100% Focus Pixels (Fusion Main); Hybrid Focus Pixels (Fusion Ultra Wide)	Hybrid Focus Pixels	100% Focus Pixels (Fusion Main and 5x Telephoto); Hybrid Focus Pixels (Ultra Wide)		100% Focus Pixels (All cameras)		100% Focus Pixels (All cameras)	100% Focus Pixels (Ultra Wide, Main and 2x Telephoto); With Focus Pixels (3x Telephoto)
Rear Camera	Camera	Optical Zoom	0.5x, 1x, 2x	0.5x, 1x, 2x, 4x, 8x		1x, 2x	0.5x, 1x, 2x, 4x, 8x		1x, 2x	0.5x, 1x, 2x	1x, 2x	0.5x, 1x, 2x, 5x		0.5x, 1x, 2x		0.5x, 1x, 2x, 5x	0.5x, 1x, 2x, 3x
Rear Camera	Camera	Digital Zoom	Up to 10x	Up to 40x		Up to 10x	Up to 40x		Up to 10x			Up to 25x		Up to 10x		Up to 25x	Up to 15x
Rear Camera	Camera	Lens Cover	Sapphire crystal lens cover														
Rear Camera	Features	HDR for Photos	Smart HDR 5														
Rear Camera	Features	Night Mode	All cameras			Yes	All cameras		Yes	All cameras	Yes	All cameras and Night Mode Portrait		All cameras			
Rear Camera	Features	Deep Fusion	All cameras														
Rear Camera	Features	Photonic Engine	Yes														
Rear Camera	Features	Macro photos	48 MP			No	48 MP		No	48 MP	No	48 MP		12 MP			
Rear Camera	Features	Photographic Styles	Photographic Styles 3			Yes	Photographic Styles 2				Yes	Photographic Styles 2				Yes	
Rear Camera	Features	Portrait Mode	Next Generation with Focus and Depth Control								With Depth Control	Next Generation with Focus and Depth Control					
Rear Camera	Features	Portrait Lighting	With six effects (Natural, Studio, Contour, Stage, Stage Mono, High‑Key Mono)														
Rear Camera	Features	Spatial Photos	No	Yes		No	Yes		No	Yes	No	Yes				iOS 18.1 or later	
Rear Camera	Features	Apple ProRAW	No	Yes		No	Yes		No			Yes		No		Yes	
Rear Camera	Features	Panorama	Up to 63 MP														
Rear Camera	Features	Burst Mode	Yes														
Rear Camera	Features	Flash	True Tone flash	Adaptive True Tone flash		True Tone flash	Adaptive True Tone flash		True Tone flash			Adaptive True Tone flash		True Tone flash		Adaptive True Tone flash	
Rear Camera	Features	Live Photos	Yes														
Rear Camera	Features	Wide Color Capture	Yes														
Rear Camera	Video Recording	Resolution and Frame Rate	4K at 24 fps, 25 fps, 30 fps, 60 fps, 100 fps (Fusion Main) or 120 fps (Fusion Main); 1080p HD at 25 fps, 30 fps, 60 fps or 120 fps (Fusion Main)			4K at 24 fps, 25 fps, 30 fps or 60 fps 1080p HD at 25 fps, 30 fps or 60 fps	4K at 24 fps, 25 fps, 30 fps, 60 fps, 100 fps (Fusion Main) or 120 fps (Fusion Main); 1080p HD at 25 fps, 30 fps, 60 fps or 120 fps (Fusion Main)		4K at 24 fps, 25 fps, 30 fps or 60 fps 1080p HD at 25 fps, 30 fps or 60 fps			4K at 24 fps, 25 fps, 30 fps, 60 fps, 100 fps (Fusion Main) or 120 fps (Fusion Main); 1080p HD at 25 fps, 30 fps, 60 fps or 120 fps (Fusion Main)		4K at 24 fps, 25 fps, 30 fps or 60 fps 1080p HD at 25 fps, 30 fps or 60 fps			
Rear Camera	Video Recording	Slo-mo Video	4K at 120 fps (Fusion Main); 1080p at 120 fps or 240 fps (All cameras)			1080p at 120 fps or 240 fps	4K at 120 fps (Fusion Main); 1080p at 120 fps or 240 fps (All cameras)		1080p at 120 fps or 240 fps			4K at 120 fps (Fusion Main); 1080p at 120 fps or 240 fps (All cameras)		1080p at 120 fps or 240 fps			
Rear Camera	Video Recording	Dolby Vision	Up to 4K at 120 fps (Fusion); Up to 4K at 60 fps (All cameras)			Up to 4K at 60 fps	Up to 4K at 120 fps (Fusion); Up to 4K at 60 fps (All cameras)		Up to 4K at 60 fps			Up to 4K at 120 fps (Fusion); Up to 4K at 60 fps (All cameras)		Up to 4K at 60 fps			
Rear Camera	Video Recording	Dual Capture	Up to 4K Dolby Vision at 30 fps			No	Up to 4K Dolby Vision at 30 fps				No						
Rear Camera	Video Recording	Cinematic Mode	Up to 4K Dolby Vision at 60 fps			No	Up to 4K Dolby Vision at 25 fps or 30 fps		No	Up to 4K Dolby Vision at 25 fps or 30 fps	No	Up to 4K Dolby Vision at 25 fps or 30 fps					
Rear Camera	Video Recording	ProRes Video	No	4K at 30 fps 4K at 120 fps (Fusion Main) or 4K at 60 fps (All cameras) with external recording		No	4K at 30 fps 4K at 120 fps (Fusion Main) or 4K at 60 fps (All cameras) with external recording		No			1080p at 30 fps for 128 GB storage (iPhone 16 Pro only); 4K at 30 fps for 256 GB storage and above 4K at 120 fps (Fusion Main) or 4K at 60 fps (All cameras) with external recording		No		1080p at 30 fps for 128 GB storage (iPhone 15 Pro only); 4K at 30 fps for 256 GB storage and above 4K at 60 fps with external recording	
Rear Camera	Video Recording	ProRes RAW	No	Yes		No	Yes		No								
Rear Camera	Video Recording	Genlock support	No	Yes		No	Yes		No								
Rear Camera	Video Recording	Action Mode	Up to 2.8K Dolby Vision at 60 fps			No	Up to 2.8K Dolby Vision at 60 fps				No	Up to 2.8K Dolby Vision at 60 fps					
Rear Camera	Video Recording	Macro Video	Yes			No	Yes		No	Yes	No	Yes					
Rear Camera	Video Recording	ACES	No	Yes		No	Yes		No			Yes		No		Yes	
Rear Camera	Video Recording	Apple Log	No	Apple Log 2		No	Apple Log 2		No			Apple Log 1		No		Apple Log 1	
Rear Camera	Video Recording	Optical Zoom for Video	0.5x, 1x, 2x	0.5x, 1x, 2x, 4x, 8x		1x, 2x	0.5x, 1x, 2x, 4x, 8x		1x, 2x	0.5x, 1x, 2x	1x, 2x	0.5x, 1x, 2x, 5x		0.5x, 1x, 2x		0.5x, 1x, 2x, 5x	0.5x, 1x, 2x, 3x
Rear Camera	Video Recording	Digital Zoom for Video	Up to 6x	Up to 24x		Up to 6x	Up to 15x		Up to 6x			Up to 15x		Up to 6x		Up to 15x	Up to 9x
Rear Camera	Video Recording	Optical Image Stabilization for Video	Sensor-shift (Fusion Main)	Second-generation sensor-shift (Fusion Main); 3D sensor‑shift with tetraprism design (Fusion Telephoto)		Lens-shift	Second-generation sensor-shift (Fusion Main); 3D sensor‑shift with tetraprism design (Fusion Telephoto)		Sensor-shift	Sensor-shift (Fusion Main)	Lens-shift	Second-generation sensor-shift (Fusion Main); 3D sensor‑shift with tetraprism design (5x Telephoto)		Sensor-shift (Fusion Main)		Second-generation sensor-shift (Main and 2x Telephoto); 3D sensor‑shift with tetraprism design (5x Telephoto)	Second-generation sensor-shift (Main and 2x Telephoto); Lens-shift (3x Telephoto)
Rear Camera	Video Recording	Cinematic Video Stabilization	4K, 1080p and 720p														
Rear Camera	Video Recording	QuickTake Video	Up to 4K Dolby Vision at 60 fps			Yes	Up to 4K Dolby Vision at 60 fps				Yes	Up to 4K Dolby Vision at 60 fps				Yes	
Rear Camera	Video Recording	Timelapse Video	With Stabilization														
Rear Camera	Video Recording	Audio Zoom	Yes														
Rear Camera	Video Recording	Stereo Recording	With Spatial Audio													Yes	
Rear Camera	Video Recording	Wind Noise Reduction	Yes													No	
Rear Camera	Video Recording	Audio Mix	Yes													No	
Front Camera	Camera	Resolution	12 MP Center Stage	18 MP Center Stage		12 MP TrueDepth	18 MP Center Stage				12 MP TrueDepth						
Front Camera	Camera	Aperture	f/2.2	f/1.9													
Front Camera	Camera	Autofocus	No	With Focus Pixels													
Front Camera	Camera	Auto Image Stabilization	Yes														
Front Camera	Camera	Center Stage for photos	Yes			No	Yes				No						
Front Camera	Features	HDR for Photos	Smart HDR 5														
Front Camera	Features	Night Mode	Yes														
Front Camera	Features	Deep Fusion	Yes														
Front Camera	Features	Photonic Engine	Yes														
Front Camera	Features	Photographic Styles	Photographic Styles 3			Yes	Photographic Styles 2				Yes	Photographic Styles 2				Yes	
Front Camera	Features	Portrait Mode	Next Generation with Focus and Depth Control								With Depth Control	Next Generation with Focus and Depth Control					
Front Camera	Features	Portrait Lighting	With six effects (Natural, Studio, Contour, Stage, Stage Mono, High‑Key Mono)														
Front Camera	Features	Animoji and Memoji	Yes														
Front Camera	Features	Flash	Retina Flash														
Front Camera	Features	Live Photos	Yes														
Front Camera	Features	Wide Color Capture	Yes														
Front Camera	Video Recording	Resolution and Frame Rate	4K at 24 fps, 25 fps, 30 fps or 60 fps 1080p HD at 25 fps, 30 fps or 60 fps														
Front Camera	Video Recording	Slo-mo Video	1080p at 120 fps														
Front Camera	Video Recording	Dolby Vision	Up to 4K at 60 fps														
Front Camera	Video Recording	Dual Capture	Up to 4K Dolby Vision at 30 fps			No	Up to 4K Dolby Vision at 30 fps				No						
Front Camera	Video Recording	Center Stage for Video Calls	Yes			No	Yes				No						
Front Camera	Video Recording	Ultra-stabilized video	Yes			No	Yes				No						
Front Camera	Video Recording	Cinematic Mode	Up to 4K Dolby Vision at 25 fps or 30 fps			No	Up to 4K Dolby Vision at 25 fps or 30 fps		No	Up to 4K Dolby Vision at 25 fps or 30 fps	No	Up to 4K Dolby Vision at 25 fps or 30 fps					
Front Camera	Video Recording	ProRes Video	No	4K at 30 fps 4K at 60 fps with external recording		No	4K at 30 fps 4K at 60 fps with external recording		No			1080p at 30 fps for 128 GB storage (iPhone 16 Pro only); 4K at 30 fps for 256 GB storage and above 4K at 60 fps with external recording		No		1080p at 30 fps for 128 GB storage (iPhone 16 Pro only); 4K at 30 fps for 256 GB storage and above 4K at 60 fps with external recording	
Front Camera	Video Recording	Cinematic Video Stabilization	4K, 1080p and 720p														
Front Camera	Video Recording	QuickTake Video	Up to 4K Dolby Vision at 60 fps			Yes	Up to 4K Dolby Vision at 60 fps				Yes	Up to 4K Dolby Vision at 60 fps				Yes	
Front Camera	Video Recording	FaceTime	FaceTime HD (1080p) over 5G or Wi‑Fi														
Audio	Playback		Spatial Audio						Spatial Audio with compatible AirPods	Spatial Audio							
Audio	Dolby Atmos		Built-in speakers and supported headphones						Built-in speaker and supported headphones	Built-in speakers and supported headphones							
Audio	Microphone		Yes	Studio-quality four-mic array		Yes	Studio-quality four-mic array		Yes			Studio-quality four-mic array		Yes			
Audio	3.5 mm Jack		No														
Hearing Aid Compatibility	ANSI C63.19		Compliance through waiver DA 23-914													2011	
Hearing Aid Compatibility	HAC Rating		Not applicable to 2019 ANSI C63.19													M3, T4	
Hearing Aid Compatibility	Compatible with Made for iPhone Hearing Aids		Yes														
Power	Battery		3.91 V 19.07 W·h (4,883 mA·h)	eSIM only: 3.91 V 21.75 W·h (5,567 mA·h); Nano-SIM: 3.91 V 21.06 W·h (5,391 mA·h)	eSIM only: 3.91 V 16.76 W·h (4,288 mA·h); Nano-SIM: 3.91 V 15.86 W·h (4,056 mA·h)	3.88 V 15.55 W·h (4,005 mA·h)	eSIM only: 3.89 V 19.77 W·h (5,088 mA·h); Nano-SIM: 3.89 V 18.75 W·h (4,823 mA·h)	eSIM only: 3.89 V 16.56 W·h (4,252 mA·h); Nano-SIM: 3.89 V 15.53 W·h (3,988 mA·h)	3.89 V 12.26 W·h (3,149 mA·h)	3.89 V 14.35 W·h (3,692 mA·h)	3.88 V 15.55 W·h (4,005 mA·h)	3.88 V 18.17 W·h (4,685 mA·h)	3.89 V 13.94 W·h (3,582 mA·h)	3.88 V 18.11 W·h (4,674 mA·h)	3.89 V 13.84 W·h (3,561 mA·h)	3.87 V 17.11 W·h (4,422 mA·h)	3.88 V 12.70 W·h (3,274 mA·h)
Power	Fast Charging		60 W, up to 50% charge in 20 minutes (40 W adapter sold separately)	60 W, up to 50% charge in 15 minutes (40 W adapter sold separately)		20 W, up to 50% charge in 30 minutes (20 W adapter sold separately)	40 W, up to 50% charge in 20 minutes (40 W adapter sold separately)		20 W, up to 50% charge in 30 minutes (20 W adapter sold separately)	40 W, up to 50% charge in 20 minutes (40 W adapter sold separately)	20 W, up to 50% charge in 30 minutes (20 W adapter sold separately); 35 minutes for iPhone 15 Pro Max, iPhone 16 Plus and iPhone 16 Pro Max						
Power	Wireless Charging		25 W Qi2.2			15 W Qi2	25 W Qi2.2		20 W Qi2.2	25 W Qi2.2	7.5 W Qi	25 W Qi2.2 (iOS 26 or later); 15 W Qi2				15 W Qi2	
Power	MagSafe Charging		25 W peak power with 30 W adapter or higher			15 W peak power with 20 W adapter or higher	25 W peak power with 30 W adapter or higher		20 W peak power with 30 W adapter or higher	25 W peak power with 30 W adapter or higher	No	25 W peak power with 30 W adapter or higher 22.5 W peak power for iPhone 16 and iPhone 16 Pro				15 W peak power with 20 W adapter or higher	

==== Without Apple Intelligence ====
Model			iPhone 15 Plus	iPhone 15	iPhone 14 Pro Max	iPhone 14 Pro	iPhone 14 Plus	iPhone 14	iPhone SE (3rd generation)	iPhone 13 Pro Max	iPhone 13 Pro	iPhone 13	iPhone 13 mini	iPhone 12 Pro Max	iPhone 12 Pro	iPhone 12	iPhone 12 mini	iPhone SE (2nd generation)	iPhone 11 Pro Max	iPhone 11 Pro	iPhone 11
Picture																					
Basic Info	Hardware Strings		iPhone15,5	iPhone15,4	iPhone15,3	iPhone15,2	iPhone14,8	iPhone14,7	iPhone14,6	iPhone14,3	iPhone14,2	iPhone14,5	iPhone14,4	iPhone13,4	iPhone13,3	iPhone13,2	iPhone13,1	iPhone12,8	iPhone12,5	iPhone12,3	iPhone12,1
Basic Info	Model number		A2847; A3093; A3094; A3096	A2846; A3089; A3090; A3092	A2651; A2893; A2894; A2895; A2896	A2650; A2889; A2890; A2891; A2892	A2632; A2885; A2886; A2887; A2888	A2649; A2881; A2882; A2883; A2884	A2595; A2782; A2783; A2784; A2785	A2484; A2641; A2644; A2645; A2643	A2483; A2636; A2638; A2639; A2640	A2482; A2631; A2633; A2634; A2635	A2481; A2626; A2628; A2629; A2630	A2342; A2410; A2411; A2412	A2341; A2406; A2407; A2408	A2172; A2402; A2403; A2404	A2176; A2398; A2399; A2400	A2275; A2296; A2298	A2161; A2218; A2220	A2160; A2215; A2217	A2111; A2221; A2223
Basic Info	Date	Announced	September 12, 2023		September 7, 2022				March 8, 2022	September 14, 2021				October 13, 2020				April 15, 2020	September 10, 2019		
Basic Info	Date	Released	September 22, 2023		September 16, 2022		October 7, 2022	September 16, 2022	March 18, 2022	September 24, 2021				November 13, 2020	October 23, 2020		November 13, 2020	April 24, 2020	September 20, 2019		
Basic Info	Date	Discontinued	September 9, 2025		September 12, 2023		February 19, 2025 (Outside EEA); December 27, 2024 (EEA)			September 7, 2022		September 9, 2024	September 12, 2023	September 14, 2021		September 12, 2023	September 7, 2022	March 8, 2022	October 13, 2020		64 GB and 128 GB: September 7, 2022; 256 GB: September 14, 2021
Basic Info	Date	Unsupported	Supported																		
Basic Info	Operating System	Initial	iOS 17.0		iOS 16.0				iOS 15.4	iOS 15.0				iOS 14.1				iOS 13.4	iOS 13.0		
Basic Info	Operating System	Latest	iOS 27.2.1		iOS 27.2.1				iOS 27.2.1	iOS 27.2.1				iOS 27.2.1				iOS 27.2.1	iOS 27.2.1		
Colors							From March 14, 2023, to February 19, 2025:			From March 18, 2022, to September 7, 2022:		From March 18, 2022, to September 12, 2023 / September 9, 2024:				From April 30, 2021, to September 7, 2022 / September 12, 2023:					
Materials	Front		Glass front with Ceramic Shield						Glass front	Glass front with Ceramic Shield								Glass front			
Materials	Back		Color-infused glass back		Textured matte glass back		Glass back			Textured matte glass back		Glass back		Textured matte glass back		Glass back			Textured matte glass back		Glass back
Materials	Side		Aluminum sides		Stainless steel sides		Aluminum sides			Stainless steel sides		Aluminum sides		Stainless steel sides		Aluminum sides			Stainless steel sides		Aluminum sides
Resistant			IP68 (Maximum depth of 6 meters up to 30 minutes)						IP67 (Maximum depth of 1 meter up to 30 minutes)	IP68 (Maximum depth of 6 meters up to 30 minutes)								IP67 (Maximum depth of 1 meter up to 30 minutes)	IP68 (Maximum depth of 4 meters up to 30 minutes)		IP68 (Maximum depth of 2 meters up to 30 minutes)
Secure Authentication	Touch ID		No						Second-generation	No								Second-generation	No		
Secure Authentication	Face ID		Yes						No	Yes								No	Yes		
Buttons	Action Button		Ring / Silent Switch																		
Buttons	Camera Control		No																		
Dimensions	Height		160.9 mm (6.33 in)	147.6 mm (5.81 in)	160.7 mm (6.33 in)	147.5 mm (5.81 in)	160.8 mm (6.33 in)	146.7 mm (5.78 in)	138.4 mm (5.45 in)	160.8 mm (6.33 in)	146.7 mm (5.78 in)		131.5 mm (5.18 in)	160.8 mm (6.33 in)	146.7 mm (5.78 in)		131.5 mm (5.18 in)	138.4 mm (5.45 in)	158 mm (6.2 in)	144 mm (5.7 in)	150.9 mm (5.94 in)
Dimensions	Width		77.8 mm (3.06 in)	71.6 mm (2.82 in)	77.6 mm (3.06 in)	71.5 mm (2.81 in)	78.1 mm (3.07 in)	71.5 mm (2.81 in)	67.3 mm (2.65 in)	78.1 mm (3.07 in)	71.5 mm (2.81 in)		64.2 mm (2.53 in)	78.1 mm (3.07 in)	71.5 mm (2.81 in)		64.2 mm (2.53 in)	67.3 mm (2.65 in)	77.8 mm (3.06 in)	71.4 mm (2.81 in)	75.7 mm (2.98 in)
Dimensions	Depth		7.8 mm (0.31 in)		7.85 mm (0.31 in)		7.8 mm (0.31 in)		7.3 mm (0.29 in)	7.65 mm (0.30 in)				7.4 mm (0.29 in)				7.3 mm (0.29 in)	8.1 mm (0.32 in)		8.3 mm (0.33 in)
Dimensions	Weight		201 g (7.1 oz)	171 g (6.0 oz)	240 g (8.5 oz)	206 g (7.3 oz)	203 g (7.2 oz)	172 g (6.1 oz)	144 g (5.1 oz)	240 g (8.5 oz)	204 g (7.2 oz)	174 g (6.1 oz)	141 g (5.0 oz)	228 g (8.0 oz)	189 g (6.7 oz)	164 g (5.8 oz)	135 g (4.8 oz)	148 g (5.2 oz)	226 g (8.0 oz)	188 g (6.6 oz)	194 g (6.8 oz)
Display	Size	Diagonal	6.69 in (170 mm)	6.12 in (155 mm)	6.69 in (170 mm)	6.12 in (155 mm)	6.68 in (170 mm)	6.06 in (154 mm)	4.7 in (120 mm)	6.68 in (170 mm)	6.06 in (154 mm)		5.42 in (138 mm)	6.68 in (170 mm)	6.06 in (154 mm)		5.42 in (138 mm)	4.7 in (120 mm)	6.46 in (164 mm)	5.85 in (149 mm)	6.06 in (154 mm)
Display	Size	Vertical-by-Horizontal	6.07 by 2.8 in (154 by 71 mm)	5.56 by 2.56 in (141 by 65 mm)	6.07 by 2.8 in (154 by 71 mm)	5.56 by 2.56 in (141 by 65 mm)	6.06 by 2.8 in (154 by 71 mm)	5.54 by 2.56 in (141 by 65 mm)	4.1 by 2.3 in (104 by 58 mm)	6.06 by 2.8 in (154 by 71 mm)	5.54 by 2.56 in (141 by 65 mm)		4.92 by 2.27 in (125 by 58 mm)	6.06 by 2.8 in (154 by 71 mm)	5.54 by 2.56 in (141 by 65 mm)		4.92 by 2.27 in (125 by 58 mm)	4.1 by 2.3 in (104 by 58 mm)	5.9 by 2.73 in (150 by 69 mm)	5.31 by 2.45 in (135 by 62 mm)	5.54 by 2.56 in (141 by 65 mm)
Display	Resolution	Vertical-by-Horizontal	2796 × 1290	2556 × 1179	2796 × 1290	2556 × 1179	2778 × 1284	2532 × 1170	1334 × 750	2778 × 1284	2532 × 1170		2340 × 1080	2778 × 1284	2532 × 1170		2340 × 1080	1334 × 750	2688 × 1242	2436 × 1125	1792 × 828
Display	Resolution	Density	460 ppi				458 ppi	460 ppi	326 ppi	458 ppi	460 ppi		476 ppi	458 ppi	460 ppi		476 ppi	326 ppi	458 ppi		326 ppi
Display	Resolution	Aspect Ratio	~19.5:9						16:9	~19.5:9								16:9	~19.5:9		
Display	Multi-touch		Yes																		
Display	Technology		Super Retina XDR display all-screen OLED						Retina HD display widescreen with IPS technology	Super Retina XDR display all-screen OLED								Retina HD display widescreen with IPS technology	Super Retina XDR display all-screen OLED		Liquid Retina display all-screen with IPS technology
Display	Backlight		—N/a						LED-backlit	—N/a								LED-backlit	—N/a		LED-backlit
Display	Dynamic Island		Yes				No														
Display	Refresh Rate	Minimum	60 Hz		1 Hz		60 Hz			10 Hz		60 Hz									
Display	Refresh Rate	Maximum	60 Hz		120 Hz		60 Hz			120 Hz		60 Hz									
Display	Refresh Rate	ProMotion Display	No		Yes		No			Yes		No									
Display	Refresh Rate	Always-On Display	No		Yes		No														
Display	Brightness and Contrast	Typical Max brightness	1000 nits				800 nits		625 nits	1000 nits		800 nits				625 nits			800 nits		625 nits
Display	Brightness and Contrast	HDR Max brightness	1600 nits				1200 nits		—N/a	1200 nits								—N/a	1200 nits		—N/a
Display	Brightness and Contrast	Outdoor Max brightness	2000 nits				—N/a														
Display	Brightness and Contrast	Minimum brightness	—N/a																		
Display	Brightness and Contrast	Contrast ratio (typical)	2,000,000:1						1,400:1	2,000,000:1								1,400:1	2,000,000:1		1,400:1
Display	Brightness and Contrast	HDR Display	Yes						No	Yes								No	Yes		No
Display	Brightness and Contrast	HDR 10 Content	Yes																		
Display	Brightness and Contrast	Dolby Vision Content	With HDR						Yes	With HDR								Yes	With HDR		Yes
Display	Color	Full sRGB	Yes																		
Display	Color	Wide Color (P3)	Yes																		
Display	Color	True Tone	Yes																		
Display	Color	Night Shift	Yes																		
Display	Fingerprint-resistant oleophobic coating		Yes																		
Display	Anti-reflective coating		No																		
Display	Taptic		Haptic Touch																		
Performance	Cooling system	Vapor Chamber	No																		
Performance	Chip	Chip Name	Apple A16 Bionic				Apple A15 Bionic							Apple A14 Bionic				Apple A13 Bionic			
Performance	Chip	Technology Node	4 nm (N4P)				5 nm (N5P)							5 nm (N5)				7 nm (N7P)			
Performance	Chip	Bit	64-bit																		
Performance	Chip	Total Cores	6																		
Performance	Chip	High-performance Cores	2 × 3.46 GHz				2 × 3.23 GHz							2 × 3.09 GHz				2 × 2.65 GHz			
Performance	Chip	Energy-efficiency Cores	4 × 2.02 GHz				4 × 2.02 GHz							4 × 1.82 GHz				4 × 1.72 GHz			
Performance	Chip	Graphics Processor	Apple G15P				Apple G14P							Apple G13P				Apple G12P			
Performance	Chip	Total GPU cores	5						4	5		4									
Performance	Chip	GPU Family	Apple GPU Family 8											Apple GPU Family 7				Apple GPU Family 6			
Performance	Chip	Hardware-accelerated Ray Tracing	No																		
Performance	Chip	Neural Accelerators in GPU	No																		
Performance	Chip	Neural Engine	16-core (17 TOPS FP16)				16-core (15.8 TOPS FP16)							16-core (11 TOPS FP16)				8-core (6 TOPS FP16)			
Performance	Chip	Apple Intelligence	No																		
Performance	Chip	Visual Intelligence	No																		
Performance	RAM	RAM Size	6 GB						4 GB	6 GB		4 GB		6 GB		4 GB		3 GB	4 GB		
Performance	RAM	RAM Width	64-bit																		
Performance	RAM	RAM Type	LPDDR5-6400 (3200 MHz)				LPDDR4X-4266 (2133 MHz)														
Performance	RAM	RAM Bandwidth	51.2 GB/s				34.1 GB/s														
Performance	Storage	Storage Size	128 GB; 256 GB; 512 GB		128 GB; 256 GB; 512 GB; 1 TB		128 GB; 256 GB; 512 GB		64 GB; 128 GB; 256 GB	128 GB; 256 GB; 512 GB; 1 TB		128 GB; 256 GB; 512 GB				64 GB; 128 GB; 256 GB			64 GB; 256 GB; 512 GB		64 GB; 128 GB; 256 GB
Performance	Storage	Storage Type	NAND Flash driven by NVMe-based controller that communicates over a PCIe connection																		
Connector	Connector Type		USB-C port supporting charging and DP video output		8-pin Lightning connector port supporting charging																
Connector	Data Transfer Speed		Up to 0.48 Gbit/s (USB 2.0)																		
Connector	External Display Support		Up to 4K HDR		No																
Connectivity	Wi-Fi		Wi-Fi 6 (802.11a/b/g/n/ac/ax)																		
Connectivity	MIMO		Yes																		
Connectivity	Bluetooth		Bluetooth 5.3						Bluetooth 5.0												
Connectivity	Thread networking technology		No																		
Connectivity	NFC		With Reader Mode in background																		
Connectivity	Express Cards		With Power Reserve																		
Connectivity	Ultra Wideband Chip		Second-generation		First-generation				No	First-generation								No	First-generation		
Connectivity	Cellular	Modem	Qualcomm Snapdragon X70		Qualcomm Snapdragon X65				Qualcomm Snapdragon X57	Qualcomm Snapdragon X60				Qualcomm Snapdragon X55				Intel XMM 7660			
Connectivity	Cellular	GSM/EDGE	Yes																		
Connectivity	Cellular	UMTS/HSPA+	Yes																		
Connectivity	Cellular	DC-HSDPA	Yes																		
Connectivity	Cellular	CDMA	No							CDMA EV-DO Rev. A											
Connectivity	Cellular	4G/LTE	Gigabit LTE																		
Connectivity	Cellular	5G	sub-6 GHz and mmWave (U.S. models)						sub-6 GHz	sub-6 GHz and mmWave (U.S. models)								No			
Connectivity	VoLTE		Yes																		
Connectivity	SIM Card	Form Factor	Nano-SIM; No physical SIM card form-factor in U.S. models						Nano-SIM												
Connectivity	SIM Card	e-SIM	Except Mainland China, Hong Kong and Macau models						Except Mainland China models	Except Mainland China, Hong Kong and Macau models			Except Mainland China models	Except Mainland China, Hong Kong and Macau models			Except Mainland China models		Except Mainland China, Hong Kong and Macau models		
Connectivity	SIM Card	Dual SIM	1 × Nano-SIM + 1 × e-SIM or 2 × e-SIM											1 × Nano-SIM + 1 × e-SIM							
Connectivity	SIM Card	Dual SIM	2 × Nano-SIM in Mainland China, Hong Kong and Macau models						Not supported in Mainland China models	2 × Nano-SIM in Mainland China, Hong Kong and Macau models			Not supported in Mainland China models	2 × Nano-SIM in Mainland China, Hong Kong and Macau models			Not supported in Mainland China models		2 × Nano-SIM in Mainland China, Hong Kong and Macau models		
Connectivity	GPS	GPS	Yes		Precision Dual-frequency		Yes														
Connectivity	GPS	GLONASS/GNSS	Yes		Precision Dual-frequency		Yes														
Connectivity	GPS	Galileo	Yes		Precision Dual-frequency		Yes											No			
Connectivity	GPS	QZSS	Yes		Precision Dual-frequency		Yes											No			
Connectivity	GPS	BeiDou	Yes		Precision Dual-frequency		Yes											No			
Connectivity	GPS	NavIC	No																		
Safety	Emergency SOS		Yes																		
Safety	Emergency SOS Satellite		Selected regions only						No												
Safety	Crash Detection		Yes						No												
Sensors	LiDAR		No		Yes		No			Yes		No		Yes		No					
Sensors	Proximity Sensor		Yes																		
Sensors	Gyro		High dynamic range gyro						Three-axis gyro												
Sensors	Accelerometer		High-g accelerometer						Yes												
Sensors	Ambient Light Sensor		Dual ambient light sensor						Yes												
Sensors	Barometer		Yes																		
Rear Camera	Camera	Resolution	48 MP Main; 12 MP Ultra Wide; 12 MP 2x Telephoto (Enabled by Quad-pixel)		48 MP Main; 12 MP Ultra Wide; 12 MP 2x Telephoto (Enabled by Quad-pixel); 12 MP 3x Telephoto		12 MP Main; 12 MP Ultra Wide		12 MP Main	12 MP Main; 12 MP Ultra Wide; 12 MP 3x Telephoto		12 MP Main; 12 MP Ultra Wide		12 MP Main; 12 MP Ultra Wide; 12 MP 2.5x Telephoto	12 MP Main; 12 MP Ultra Wide; 12 MP 2x Telephoto	12 MP Main; 12 MP Ultra Wide		12 MP Main	12 MP Main; 12 MP Ultra Wide; 12 MP 2x Telephoto		12 MP Main; 12 MP Ultra Wide
Rear Camera	Camera	Super High Resolution Support	24 MP (Default); 48 MP HEIF		48 MP HEIF and 48 MP ProRAW		No														
Rear Camera	Camera	Aperture	f/1.6 (Fusion) f/2.4 (Ultra Wide)		f/1.78 (Main and 2x Telephoto) f/2.2 (Ultra Wide) f/2.8 (3x Telephoto)		f/1.5 (Fusion) f/2.4 (Ultra Wide)		f/1.8	f/1.5 (Main) f/1.8 (Ultra Wide) f/2.8 (3x Telephoto)		f/1.6 (Fusion) f/2.4 (Ultra Wide)		f/1.6 (Main) f/2.4 (Ultra Wide) f/2.2 (2.5x Telephoto)	f/1.6 (Main) f/2.4 (Ultra Wide) f/2.0 (2x Telephoto)	f/1.6 (Fusion) f/2.4 (Ultra Wide)		f/1.8	f/1.8 (Main) f/2.4 (Ultra Wide) f/2.0 (2x Telephoto)		f/1.8 (Main) f/2.4 (Ultra Wide)
Rear Camera	Camera	Focal Length	13 mm (Ultra Wide); 26 mm (1x Main); 52 mm (2x Telephoto)		13 mm (Ultra Wide); 24 mm (1x Main); 48 mm (2x Telephoto); 77 mm (3x Telephoto)		13 mm (Ultra Wide); 26 mm (Main)		28 mm	13 mm (Ultra Wide); 26 mm (Main); 77 mm (3x Telephoto)		13 mm (Ultra Wide); 26 mm (Main)		13 mm (Ultra Wide); 26 mm (Main); 65 mm (2.5x Telephoto)	13 mm (Ultra Wide); 26 mm (Main); 52 mm (2x Telephoto)	13 mm (Ultra Wide); 26 mm (Main)		28 mm	13 mm (Ultra Wide); 26 mm (Main); 52 mm (2x Telephoto)		13 mm (Ultra Wide); 26 mm (Main)
Rear Camera	Camera	Pixel Size	2 μm (1x Main, 12 MP); 1 μm (1x Main, 48 MP); 1 μm (2x Telephoto); 1 μm (Ultra Wide)		2.44 μm (1x Main, 12 MP); 1.22 μm (1x Main, 48 MP); 1.22 μm (2x Telephoto); 1.4 μm (Ultra Wide); 1 μm (3x Telephoto)		1.9 μm (Main); 1 μm (Ultra Wide)		1.22 μm	1.9 μm (Main); 1 μm (Ultra Wide); 1 μm (3x Telephoto)		1.7 μm (Main); 1 μm (Ultra Wide)		1.7 μm (Main); 1 μm (Ultra Wide); 1 μm (2.5x Telephoto)	1.4 μm (Main); 1 μm (Ultra Wide); 1 μm (2x Telephoto)	1.4 μm (Main); 1 μm (Ultra Wide)		1.22 μm	1.4 μm (Main); 1 μm (Ultra Wide); 1 μm (2x Telephoto)		1.4 μm (Main); 1 μm (Ultra Wide)
Rear Camera	Camera	Sensor Size	1/1.59" (Main); 1/3.6" (Ultra Wide)		1/1.28" (Main); 1/2.55" (Ultra Wide); 1/3.4" (3x Telephoto)		1/1.65" (Main); 1/3.6" (Ultra Wide)		1/2.93"	1/1.65" (Main); 1/3.6" (Ultra Wide); 1/3.4" (3x Telephoto)		1/1.88" (Main); 1/3.6" (Ultra Wide)		1/1.88" (Main); 1/3.6" (Ultra Wide); 1/3.4" (2.5x Telephoto)	1/2.55" (Main); 1/3.6" (Ultra Wide); 1/3.4" (2x Telephoto)	1/2.55" (Main); 1/3.6" (Ultra Wide)		1/2.93"	1/2.55" (Main); 1/3.6" (Ultra Wide); 1/3.4" (2x Telephoto)		1/2.55" (Main); 1/3.6" (Ultra Wide)
Rear Camera	Camera	Optical Image Stabilization	Sensor-shift (Main and 2x Telephoto)		Second-generation sensor-shift (Main and 2x Telephoto); Lens-shift (3x Telephoto)		Sensor-shift (Main)		Lens-shift	Sensor-shift (Main); Lens-shift (3x Telephoto)		Sensor-shift (Main)		Sensor-shift (Main); Lens-shift (2.5x Telephoto)	Lens-shift (Main and 2x Telephoto)	Lens-shift (Main)		Lens-shift	Lens-shift (Main and 2x Telephoto)		Lens-shift (Main)
Rear Camera	Camera	Auto Image Stabilization	Yes																		
Rear Camera	Camera	Element Lens	?		Seven-element lens (Main and 2x Telephoto); Six-element lens (Ultra Wide and 3x Telephoto)		Seven-element lens (Main); Five-element lens (Ultra Wide)		Six-element lens	Seven-element lens (Main); Six-element lens (Ultra Wide and 3x Telephoto)		Seven-element lens (Main); Five-element lens (Ultra Wide)		Seven-element lens (Main); Six-element lens (2.5x Telephoto); Five-element lens (Ultra Wide)	Seven-element lens (Main); Six-element lens (2x Telephoto); Five-element lens (Ultra Wide)	Seven-element lens (Main); Five-element lens (Ultra Wide)		Six-element lens	Six-element lens (Main and 2x Telephoto); Five-element lens (Ultra Wide)		Six-element lens (Main); Five-element lens (Ultra Wide)
Rear Camera	Camera	Autofocus	100% Focus Pixels (Main and 2x Telephoto)		100% Focus Pixels (Ultra Wide, Main and 2x Telephoto); With Focus Pixels (3x Telephoto)		100% Focus Pixels (Main)		With Focus Pixels	100% Focus Pixels (Main); With Focus Pixels (Ultra Wide and 3x Telephoto)		100% Focus Pixels (Main)		100% Focus Pixels (Main); With Focus Pixels (2.5x Telephoto)	100% Focus Pixels (Main); With Focus Pixels (2x Telephoto)	100% Focus Pixels (Main)		With Focus Pixels	100% Focus Pixels (Main); With Focus Pixels (2x Telephoto)		100% Focus Pixels (Main)
Rear Camera	Camera	Optical Zoom	0.5x, 1x, 2x		0.5x, 1x, 2x, 3x		0.5x, 1x		1x	0.5x, 1x, 3x		0.5x, 1x		0.5x, 1x, 2.5x	0.5x, 1x, 2x	0.5x, 1x		1x	0.5x, 1x, 2x		0.5x, 1x
Rear Camera	Camera	Digital Zoom	Up to 10x		Up to 15x		Up to 5x			Up to 15x		Up to 5x		Up to 12x	Up to 10x	Up to 5x			Up to 10x		Up to 5x
Rear Camera	Camera	Lens Cover	Sapphire crystal lens cover																		
Rear Camera	Features	HDR for Photos	Smart HDR 5		Smart HDR 4									Smart HDR 3				Smart HDR 2			
Rear Camera	Features	Night Mode	All cameras		All cameras and Night Mode Portrait		All cameras		No	All cameras and Night Mode Portrait		All cameras		Ultra Wide, Main and Night Mode Portrait		All cameras		No	Main		
Rear Camera	Features	Deep Fusion	All cameras															No	Main and 2x Telephoto		Main
Rear Camera	Features	Photonic Engine	Yes						No												
Rear Camera	Features	Macro photos	No		12 MP		No			12 MP		No									
Rear Camera	Features	Photographic Styles	Yes											No							
Rear Camera	Features	Portrait Mode	Next Generation with Focus and Depth Control		With Focus and Depth Control				With Depth Control	With Focus and Depth Control				With Depth Control							
Rear Camera	Features	Portrait Lighting	With six effects (Natural, Studio, Contour, Stage, Stage Mono, High‑Key Mono)																		
Rear Camera	Features	Spatial Photos	No																		
Rear Camera	Features	Apple ProRAW	No		Yes		No			Yes		No		Yes		No					
Rear Camera	Features	Panorama	Up to 63 MP																		
Rear Camera	Features	Burst Mode	Yes																		
Rear Camera	Features	Flash	True Tone flash		Adaptive True Tone flash		True Tone flash		True Tone Flash with Slow Sync												
Rear Camera	Features	Live Photos	Yes																		
Rear Camera	Features	Wide Color Capture	Yes																		
Rear Camera	Video Recording	Resolution and Frame Rate	4K at 24 fps, 25 fps, 30 fps or 60 fps 1080p HD at 25 fps, 30 fps or 60 fps																		
Rear Camera	Video Recording	Slo-mo Video	1080p at 120 fps or 240 fps																		
Rear Camera	Video Recording	Dolby Vision HDR	Up to 4K at 60 fps						No	Up to 4K at 60 fps						1080p at 30 fps or 4K at 30 fps		No			
Rear Camera	Video Recording	Dual Capture	No																		
Rear Camera	Video Recording	Cinematic Mode	Up to 4K Dolby Vision at 25 fps or 30 fps						No	1080p Dolby Vision at 25 fps or 30 fps				No							
Rear Camera	Video Recording	ProRes Video	No		1080p at 30 fps for 128 GB storage 4K at 30 fps for 256 GB storage and above		No			1080p at 30 fps for 128 GB storage 4K at 30 fps for 256 GB storage and above		No									
Rear Camera	Video Recording	ProRes RAW	No																		
Rear Camera	Video Recording	Genlock support	No																		
Rear Camera	Video Recording	Action Mode	Up to 2.8K Dolby Vision at 60 fps						No												
Rear Camera	Video Recording	Macro Video	No		Yes		No			Yes		No									
Rear Camera	Video Recording	ACES	No																		
Rear Camera	Video Recording	Apple Log	No																		
Rear Camera	Video Recording	Optical Zoom for Video	0.5x, 1x, 2x		0.5x, 1x, 2x, 3x		0.5x, 1x		1x	0.5x, 1x, 3x		0.5x, 1x		0.5x, 1x, 2.5x	0.5x, 1x, 2x	0.5x, 1x		1x	0.5x, 1x, 2x		0.5x, 1x
Rear Camera	Video Recording	Digital Zoom for Video	Up to 6x		Up to 9x		Up to 3x			Up to 9x		Up to 6x		Up to 7x	Up to 6x	Up to 3x			Up to 6x		Up to 3x
Rear Camera	Video Recording	Optical Image Stabilization for Video	Sensor-shift (Main and 2x Telephoto)		Second-generation sensor-shift (Main and 2x Telephoto); Lens-shift (3x Telephoto)		Sensor-shift (Main)		Lens-shift	Sensor-shift (Main); Lens-shift (3x Telephoto)		Sensor-shift (Main)		Sensor-shift (Main); Lens-shift (2.5x Telephoto)	Lens-shift (Main and 2x Telephoto)	Lens-shift (Main)		Lens-shift	Lens-shift (Main and 2x Telephoto)		Lens-shift (Main)
Rear Camera	Video Recording	Cinematic Video Stabilization	4K, 1080p and 720p																		
Rear Camera	Video Recording	QuickTake Video	Yes																		
Rear Camera	Video Recording	Timelapse Video	With Stabilization																		
Rear Camera	Video Recording	Audio Zoom	Yes						No	Yes								No	Yes		
Rear Camera	Video Recording	Stereo Recording	Yes																		
Rear Camera	Video Recording	Wind Noise Reduction	No																		
Rear Camera	Video Recording	Audio Mix	No																		
Front Camera	Camera	Resolution	12 MP TrueDepth						7 MP FaceTime HD	12 MP TrueDepth								7 MP FaceTime HD	12 MP TrueDepth		
Front Camera	Camera	Aperture	f/1.9						f/2.2												
Front Camera	Camera	Autofocus	With Focus Pixels						No												
Front Camera	Camera	Auto Image Stabilization	Yes																		
Front Camera	Camera	Center Stage for photos	No																		
Front Camera	Features	HDR for Photos	Smart HDR 5		Smart HDR 4									Smart HDR 3				Smart HDR 2			
Front Camera	Features	Night Mode	Yes						No	Yes								No			
Front Camera	Features	Deep Fusion	Yes															No			
Front Camera	Features	Photonic Engine	Yes						No												
Front Camera	Features	Photographic Styles	Yes											No							
Front Camera	Features	Portrait Mode	Next Generation with Focus and Depth Control		With Focus and Depth Control				With Depth Control	With Focus and Depth Control				With Depth Control							
Front Camera	Features	Portrait Lighting	With six effects (Natural, Studio, Contour, Stage, Stage Mono, High‑Key Mono)																		
Front Camera	Features	Animoji and Memoji	Yes						No	Yes								No	Yes		
Front Camera	Features	Flash	Retina Flash																		
Front Camera	Features	Live Photos	Yes																		
Front Camera	Features	Wide Color Capture	Yes																		
Front Camera	Video Recording	Resolution and Frame Rate	4K at 24 fps, 25 fps, 30 fps or 60 fps 1080p HD at 25 fps, 30 fps or 60 fps						1080p HD at 25 fps, 30 fps or 60 fps	4K at 24 fps, 25 fps, 30 fps or 60 fps 1080p HD at 25 fps, 30 fps or 60 fps								1080p HD at 25 fps, 30 fps or 60 fps	4K at 24 fps, 25 fps, 30 fps or 60 fps 1080p HD at 25 fps, 30 fps or 60 fps		
Front Camera	Video Recording	Slo-mo Video	1080p at 120 fps						—N/a	1080p at 120 fps								—N/a	1080p at 120 fps		
Front Camera	Video Recording	Dolby Vision HDR	Up to 4K at 60 fps						No	Up to 4K at 60 fps				1080p at 30 fps or 4K at 30 fps				No			
Front Camera	Video Recording	Dual Capture	No																		
Front Camera	Video Recording	Center Stage for Video Calls	No																		
Front Camera	Video Recording	Ultra-stabilized video	No																		
Front Camera	Video Recording	Cinematic Mode	Up to 4K Dolby Vision at 25 fps or 30 fps						No	1080p Dolby Vision at 25 fps or 30 fps				No							
Front Camera	Video Recording	ProRes Video	No		1080p at 30 fps for 128 GB storage 4K at 30 fps for 256 GB storage and above		No			1080p at 30 fps for 128 GB storage 4K at 30 fps for 256 GB storage and above		No									
Front Camera	Video Recording	Cinematic Video Stabilization	4K, 1080p and 720p						1080p and 720p	4K, 1080p and 720p								1080p and 720p	4K, 1080p and 720p		
Front Camera	Video Recording	Quicktake Video	Yes																		
Front Camera	Video Recording	FaceTime	FaceTime HD (1080p) over 5G or Wi‑Fi						FaceTime HD over 5G or Wi‑Fi	FaceTime HD (1080p) over 5G or Wi‑Fi								FaceTime HD over Wi‑Fi	FaceTime HD (1080p) over Wi‑Fi		
Audio	Playback		Spatial Audio						Stereo	Spatial Audio								Stereo	Spatial Audio		
Audio	Dolby Atmos		Built-in speakers and supported headphones						Supported headphones	Built-in speakers and supported headphones								Supported headphones	Built-in speakers and supported headphones		
Audio	Microphone		Yes																		
Audio	3.5 mm Jack		No																		
Hearing Aid Compatibility	ANSI C63.19		2011																		
Hearing Aid Compatibility	HAC Rating		M3, T4																		
Hearing Aid Compatibility	Compatible with Made for iPhone Hearing Aids		Yes																		
Power	Battery		3.87 V 16.95 W·h (4,383 mA·h)	3.88 V 12.98 W·h (3,349 mA·h)	3.86 V 16.68 W·h (4,323 mA·h)	3.87 V 12.38 W·h (3,200 mA·h)	3.86 V 16.68 W·h (4,325 mA·h)	3.87 V 12.68 W·h (3,279 mA·h)	3.88 V 7.82 W·h (2,018 mA·h)	3.85 V 16.75 W·h (4,352 mA·h)	3.87 V 11.97 W·h (3,095 mA·h)	3.84 V 12.41 W·h (3,227 mA·h)	3.88 V 9.34 W·h (2,406 mA·h)	3.83 V 14.13 W·h (3,687 mA·h)	3.83 V 10.78 W·h (2,815 mA·h)		3.85 V 8.57 W·h (2,227 mA·h)	3.82 V 6.96 W·h (1,821 mA·h)	3.79 V 15.04 W·h (3,969 mA·h)	3.83 V 11.67 W·h (3,046 mA·h)	3.83 V 11.91 W·h (3,110 mA·h)
Power	Fast Charging		20 W, up to 50% charge in 30 minutes (20 W adapter sold separately); 35 minutes for iPhone 13 Pro Max, iPhone 14 Plus, iPhone 14 Pro Max and iPhone 15 Plus																20 W, up to 50% charge in 30 minutes (18 W adapter included); 35 minutes for iPhone 11 Pro Max		20 W, up to 50% charge in 30 minutes (20 W adapter sold separately)
Power	Wireless Charging		15 W Qi2 and 7.5 W Qi						7.5 W Qi	15 W Qi2 and 7.5 W Qi								7.5 W Qi			
Power	MagSafe Charging		15 W peak power with 20 W adapter or higher						No	15 W peak power with 20 W adapter or higher 12 W peak power for iPhone 12 mini and iPhone 13 mini								No			

=== Not supporting latest iOS version ===
==== 64-bit CPU ====
Model			iPhone XR	iPhone XS Max	iPhone XS	iPhone X	iPhone 8 Plus	iPhone 8	iPhone 7 Plus	iPhone 7	iPhone SE (1st generation)	iPhone 6s Plus	iPhone 6s	iPhone 6 Plus	iPhone 6	iPhone 5s
Picture																
Basic Info	Hardware Strings		iPhone11,8	iPhone11,4 iPhone11,6	iPhone11,2	iPhone10,3 iPhone10,6	iPhone10,2 iPhone10,5	iPhone10,1 iPhone10,4	iPhone9,2 iPhone9,4	iPhone9,1 iPhone9,3	iPhone8,4	iPhone8,2	iPhone8,1	iPhone7,1	iPhone7,2	iPhone6,1 iPhone6,2
Basic Info	Model number		A1984; A2105; A2106; A2107; A2108	A1921; A2101; A2102; A2104	A1920; A2097; A2098; A2100	A1865; A1902; A1901	A1864; A1897; A1898; A1899	A1863; A1905; A1906; A1907	A1661; A1784; A1785	A1660; A1778; A1779	A1662; A1723; A1724	A1634; A1687; A1699; A1690	A1633; A1688; A1700; A1691	A1522; A1524; A1593	A1549; A1586; A1589	A1533; A1453; A1457; A1530; A1518; A1528
Basic Info	Date	Announced	September 12, 2018			September 12, 2017	September 12, 2017		September 7, 2016		March 21, 2016	September 9, 2015		September 9, 2014		September 10, 2013
Basic Info	Date	Released	October 26, 2018	September 21, 2018		November 3, 2017	September 22, 2017		September 16, 2016		16 and 64 GB: March 31, 2016; 32 and 128 GB: March 24, 2017	16 GB, 64 GB, and 128 GB: September 25, 2015; 32 GB: September 7, 2016		September 19, 2014; 32 GB (iPhone 6): March 10, 2017		September 20, 2013
Basic Info	Date	Discontinued	64 GB and 128 GB: September 14, 2021; 256 GB: September 10, 2019	September 10, 2019		September 12, 2018	256 GB: September 10, 2019; 64 GB and 128 GB: April 15, 2020		256 GB: September 12, 2017; 32 GB and 128 GB: September 10, 2019		16 GB and 64 GB: March 21, 2017; 32 GB and 128 GB: September 12, 2018	16 and 64 GB: September 7, 2016; 32 GB and 128 GB: September 12, 2018		128 GB: September 9, 2015; 16 GB and 64 GB: September 7, 2016; 32 GB (iPhone 6): September 12, 2018		64 GB: September 9, 2014; 16 and 32 GB: March 21, 2016
Basic Info	Date	Unsupported	November 9, 2026			May 11, 2026			May 11, 2026					January 26, 2026		
Basic Info	Operating System	Initial	iOS 12.0			iOS 11.0.1	iOS 11.0		iOS 10.0		iOS 9.3	iOS 9.0		iOS 8.0		iOS 7.0
Basic Info	Operating System	Latest	iOS 18.7.12			iOS 16.7.16			iOS 15.8.8		iOS 15.8.8	iOS 15.8.8		iOS 12.5.8		iOS 12.5.8
Colors							From April 9, 2018, to September 12, 2018:		From release to September 12, 2018: From March 21, 2017, to September 12, 2017: (128 GB and 256 GB)					From release to September 9, 2015:	From release to September 9, 2015, and since March 10, 2017:	From release to September 9, 2015:
Materials	Front		Glass front													
Materials	Back		Glass back						Aluminum back							
Materials	Side		Aluminum sides	Stainless steel sides			Aluminum sides									
Resistant			IP67 (Maximum depth of 1 meter up to 30 minutes)	IP68 (Maximum depth of 2 meter up to 30 minutes)		IP67 (Maximum depth of 1 meter up to 30 minutes)					No					
Secure Authentication	Touch ID		No				Second-generation				First-generation	Second-generation		First-generation		
Secure Authentication	Face ID		Yes				No									
Buttons	Action Button		Ring / Silent Switch													
Buttons	Camera Control		No													
Dimensions	Height		150.9 mm (5.94 in)	157.5 mm (6.20 in)	143.6 mm (5.65 in)		158.4 mm (6.24 in)	138.4 mm (5.45 in)	158.2 mm (6.23 in)	138.3 mm (5.44 in)	123.8 mm (4.87 in)	158.2 mm (6.23 in)	138.3 mm (5.44 in)	158.1 mm (6.22 in)	138.1 mm (5.44 in)	123.8 mm (4.87 in)
Dimensions	Width		75.7 mm (2.98 in)	77.4 mm (3.05 in)	70.9 mm (2.79 in)		78.1 mm (3.07 in)	67.3 mm (2.65 in)	77.9 mm (3.07 in)	67.1 mm (2.64 in)	58.6 mm (2.31 in)	77.9 mm (3.07 in)	67.1 mm (2.64 in)	77.8 mm (3.06 in)	67.0 mm (2.64 in)	58.6 mm (2.31 in)
Dimensions	Depth		8.3 mm (0.33 in)	7.7 mm (0.30 in)			7.5 mm (0.30 in)	7.3 mm (0.29 in)	7.3 mm (0.29 in)	7.1 mm (0.28 in)	7.6 mm (0.30 in)	7.3 mm (0.29 in)	7.1 mm (0.28 in)	7.1 mm (0.28 in)	6.9 mm (0.27 in)	7.6 mm (0.30 in)
Dimensions	Weight		194 g (6.8 oz)	208 g (7.3 oz)	177 g (6.2 oz)	174 g (6.1 oz)	202 g (7.1 oz)	148 g (5.2 oz)	188 g (6.6 oz)	138 g (4.9 oz)	113 g (4.0 oz)	192 g (6.8 oz)	143 g (5.0 oz)	172 g (6.1 oz)	129 g (4.6 oz)	112 g (4.0 oz)
Display	Size	Diagonal	6.06 in (154 mm)	6.46 in (164 mm)	5.85 in (149 mm)		5.5 in (140 mm)	4.7 in (120 mm)	5.5 in (140 mm)	4.7 in (120 mm)	4 in (100 mm)	5.5 in (140 mm)	4.7 in (120 mm)	5.5 in (140 mm)	4.7 in (120 mm)	4 in (100 mm)
Display	Size	Vertical-by-Horizontal	5.54 by 2.56 in (141 by 65 mm)	5.9 by 2.73 in (150 by 69 mm)	5.31 by 2.45 in (135 by 62 mm)		4.8 by 2.7 in (122 by 69 mm)	4.1 by 2.3 in (104 by 58 mm)	4.8 by 2.7 in (122 by 69 mm)	4.1 by 2.3 in (104 by 58 mm)	3.5 by 1.9 in (89 by 48 mm)	4.8 by 2.7 in (122 by 69 mm)	4.1 by 2.3 in (104 by 58 mm)	4.8 by 2.7 in (122 by 69 mm)	4.1 by 2.3 in (104 by 58 mm)	3.5 by 1.9 in (89 by 48 mm)
Display	Resolution	Vertical-by-Horizontal	1792 × 828	2688 × 1242	2436 × 1125		1920 × 1080	1334 × 750	1920 × 1080	1334 × 750	1136 × 640	1920 × 1080	1334 × 750	1920 × 1080	1334 × 750	1136 × 640
Display	Resolution	Density (ppi)	326 ppi	458 ppi			401 ppi	326 ppi	401 ppi	326 ppi		401 ppi	326 ppi	401 ppi	326 ppi	
Display	Resolution	Aspect Ratio	~19.5:9				16:9									
Display	Multi-touch		Yes													
Display	Technology		Liquid Retina display all-screen with IPS technology	Super Retina HD display all-screen OLED			Retina HD display widescreen with IPS technology				Retina display widescreen with IPS technology	Retina HD display widescreen with IPS technology				Retina display widescreen with IPS technology
Display	Backlight		LED-backlit	—N/a			LED-backlit									
Display	Dynamic Island		No													
Display	Refresh Rate	Minimum	60 Hz													
Display	Refresh Rate	Maximum	60 Hz													
Display	Refresh Rate	ProMotion Display	No													
Display	Refresh Rate	Always-On Display	No													
Display	Brightness and Contrast	Typical Max brightness	625 nits								500 nits					
Display	Brightness and Contrast	HDR Max brightness	—N/a													
Display	Brightness and Contrast	Outdoor Max brightness	—N/a													
Display	Brightness and Contrast	Minimum brightness	—N/a													
Display	Brightness and Contrast	Contrast ratio (typical)	1,400:1	1,000,000:1			1,300:1	1,400:1	1,300:1	1,400:1	800:1	1,300:1	1,400:1	1,300:1	1,400:1	800:1
Display	Brightness and Contrast	HDR Display	No	Yes			No									
Display	Brightness and Contrast	HDR 10 Content	Yes						No							
Display	Brightness and Contrast	Dolby Vision Content	Yes	With HDR		Yes			No							
Display	Color	Full sRGB	Yes													
Display	Color	Wide Color (P3)	Yes								No					
Display	Color	True Tone	Yes						No							
Display	Color	Night Shift	Yes													
Display	Fingerprint-resistant oleophobic coating		Yes													
Display	Anti-reflective coating		No													
Display	Taptic		Haptic Touch	3D Touch							—N/a	3D Touch		—N/a		
Performance	Cooling system	Vapor Chamber	No													
Performance	Chip	Chip Name	Apple A12 Bionic			Apple A11 Bionic			Apple A10 Fusion		Apple A9			Apple A8		Apple A7
Performance	Chip	Technology Node	7 nm (N7)			10 nm			16 nm		16 nm (TSMC); 14 nm (Samsung)			20 nm		28 nm
Performance	Chip	Bit	64-bit													
Performance	Chip	Total Cores	6						4 (2 usable)		2					
Performance	Chip	High-performance Cores	2 × 2.49 GHz			2 × 2.39 GHz			2 × 2.34 GHz		2 × 1.85 GHz			2 × 1.4 GHz		2 × 1.3 GHz
Performance	Chip	Energy-efficiency Cores	4 × 1.59 GHz			4 × 1.19 GHz			2 × 1.09 GHz		—N/a					
Performance	Chip	Graphics Processor	Apple G11P			Apple G10P			PowerVR GT7600 Plus		PowerVR GT7600			PowerVR GX6450		PowerVR G6430
Performance	Chip	Total GPU cores	4			3			6					4		
Performance	Chip	GPU Family	Apple GPU Family 5			Apple GPU Family 4			Apple GPU Family 3					Apple GPU Family 2		Apple GPU Family 1
Performance	Chip	Hardware-accelerated Ray Tracing	No													
Performance	Chip	Neural Accelerators in GPU	No													
Performance	Chip	Neural Engine	8-core (5 TOPS FP16)			2-core (0.6 TOPS FP16)			—N/a							
Performance	Chip	Apple Intelligence	No													
Performance	Chip	Visual Intelligence	No													
Performance	RAM	RAM Size	3 GB	4 GB		3 GB		2 GB	3 GB	2 GB				1 GB		
Performance	RAM	RAM Width	64-bit													
Performance	RAM	RAM Type	LPDDR4X-4266 (2133 MHz)						LPDDR4-3200 (1600 MHz)					LPDDR3-1600 (800 MHz)		
Performance	RAM	RAM Bandwidth	34.1 GB/s						25.6 GB/s					12.8 GB/s		
Performance	Storage	Storage Size	64 GB; 128 GB; 256 GB	64 GB; 256 GB; 512 GB		64 GB; 256 GB	64 GB; 128 GB; 256 GB		32 GB; 128 GB; 256 GB		16 GB; 32 GB; 64 GB; 128 GB			16 GB; 64 GB; 128 GB	16 GB; 32 GB; 64 GB; 128 GB	16 GB; 32 GB; 64 GB
Performance	Storage	Storage Type	NAND Flash driven by NVMe-based controller that communicates over a PCIe connection											NAND Flash driven by eMMC-based controller		
Connector	Connector Type		8-pin Lightning connector port supporting charging													
Connector	Data Transfer Speed		Up to 0.48 Gbit/s (USB 2.0)													
Connector	External Display Support		No													
Connectivity	Wi-Fi		Wi-Fi 5 (802.11a/b/g/n/ac)													Wi-Fi 4 (802.11a/b/g/n); 802.11n in both 2.4 GHz and 5 GHz
Connectivity	MIMO		Yes								No	Yes		No		
Connectivity	Bluetooth		Bluetooth 5.0						Bluetooth 4.2							Bluetooth 4.0
Connectivity	Thread networking technology		No													
Connectivity	NFC		With Reader Mode in background			With Reader Mode in Control Center					Yes			Apple Pay only		No
Connectivity	Express Cards		With Power Reserve			Yes								No		
Connectivity	Ultra Wideband Chip		No													
Connectivity	Cellular	Modem	Intel XMM 7560			Qualcomm MDM9655; Intel XMM 7480			Qualcomm MDM9645M; Intel XMM 7360		Qualcomm MDM9625M	Qualcomm MDM9635M		Qualcomm MDM9625M		Qualcomm MDM9615M
Connectivity	Cellular	GSM/EDGE	Yes													
Connectivity	Cellular	UMTS/HSPA+	Yes													
Connectivity	Cellular	DC-HSDPA	Yes													
Connectivity	Cellular	CDMA	CDMA EV-DO Rev. A											CDMA EV-DO Rev. A and Rev. B		
Connectivity	Cellular	4G/LTE	LTE-Advanced	Gigabit LTE		LTE-Advanced					Yes	LTE-Advanced		Yes		
Connectivity	Cellular	5G	No													
Connectivity	VoLTE		Yes													No
Connectivity	SIM Card	Form Factor	Nano-SIM													
Connectivity	SIM Card	e-SIM	Except Mainland China, Hong Kong and Macau models		Except Mainland China models	No										
Connectivity	SIM Card	Dual SIM	1 × Nano-SIM + 1 × e-SIM			Not supported										
Connectivity	SIM Card	Dual SIM	2 × Nano-SIM in Mainland China, Hong Kong and Macau models		Not supported in Mainland China models	Not supported										
Connectivity	GPS	GPS	Yes													
Connectivity	GPS	GLONASS/GNSS	Yes													
Connectivity	GPS	Galileo	No													
Connectivity	GPS	QZSS	No													
Connectivity	GPS	BeiDou	No													
Connectivity	GPS	NavIC	No													
Safety	Emergency SOS		Yes													
Safety	Emergency SOS Satellite		No													
Safety	Crash Detection		No													
Sensors	LiDAR		No													
Sensors	Proximity Sensor		Yes													
Sensors	Gyro		Three-axis gyro													
Sensors	Accelerometer		Yes													
Sensors	Ambient Light Sensor		Yes													
Sensors	Barometer		Yes								No	Yes				No
Rear Camera	Camera	Resolution	12 MP Main	12 MP Main; 12 MP 2x Telephoto				12 MP Main	12 MP Main; 12 MP 2x Telephoto	12 MP Main				8 MP Main		
Rear Camera	Camera	Super High Resolution Support	No													
Rear Camera	Camera	Aperture	f/1.8	f/1.8 (Main) f/2.4 (2x Telephoto)			f/1.8 (Main) f/2.8 (2x Telephoto)	f/1.8	f/1.8 (Main) f/2.8 (2x Telephoto)	f/1.8	f/2.2					
Rear Camera	Camera	Focal Length	26 mm	26 mm (Main); 52 mm (2x Telephoto)		28 mm (Main); 52 mm (2x Telephoto)		28 mm	28 mm (Main); 52 mm (2x Telephoto)	28 mm	29 mm					
Rear Camera	Camera	Pixel Size	1.4 μm	1.4 μm (Main); 1 μm (2x Telephoto)		1.22 μm (Main); 1 μm (2x Telephoto)		1.22 μm	1.22 μm (Main); 1 μm (2x Telephoto)	1.22 μm				1.5 μm		
Rear Camera	Camera	Sensor Size	1/2.55"	1/2.55" (Main); 1/3.4" (2x Telephoto)		1/2.93" (Main); 1/3.4" (2x Telephoto)		1/2.93"	1/2.93" (Main); 1/3.4" (2x Telephoto)	1/2.93"				1/2.94"		
Rear Camera	Camera	Optical Image Stabilization	Lens-shift	Lens-shift (Main and 2x Telephoto)			Lens-shift (Main)	Lens-shift	Lens-shift (Main)	Lens-shift	No	Lens-shift	No	Lens-shift	No	
Rear Camera	Camera	Auto Image Stabilization	Yes													
Rear Camera	Camera	Element Lens	Six-element lens	Six-element lens (Main and 2x Telephoto)				Six-element lens	Six-element lens (Main and 2x Telephoto)	Six-element lens	Five-element lens					
Rear Camera	Camera	Autofocus	With Focus Pixels	With Focus Pixels (Main and 2x Telephoto)		With Focus Pixels										Yes
Rear Camera	Camera	Optical Zoom	1x	1x, 2x				1x	1x, 2x	1x						
Rear Camera	Camera	Digital Zoom	Up to 5x	Up to 10x				Up to 5x	Up to 10x	Up to 5x						
Rear Camera	Camera	Lens Cover	Sapphire crystal lens cover													
Rear Camera	Features	HDR for Photos	Smart HDR			Auto HDR			Yes							
Rear Camera	Features	Night Mode	No													
Rear Camera	Features	Deep Fusion	No													
Rear Camera	Features	Photonic Engine	No													
Rear Camera	Features	Macro photos	No													
Rear Camera	Features	Photographic Styles	No													
Rear Camera	Features	Portrait Mode	With Depth Control			Yes		No	Yes	No						
Rear Camera	Features	Portrait Lighting	With three effects (Natural, Studio, Contour)	With six effects (Natural, Studio, Contour, Stage, Stage Mono, High‑Key Mono)		With five effects (Natural, Studio, Contour, Stage, Stage Mono)		No								
Rear Camera	Features	Spatial Photos	No													
Rear Camera	Features	Apple ProRAW	No													
Rear Camera	Features	Panorama	Up to 63 MP											Up to 43 MP		Up to 28 MP
Rear Camera	Features	Burst Mode	Yes													
Rear Camera	Features	Flash	True Tone flash with Slow Sync						True Tone flash							
Rear Camera	Features	Live Photos	Yes											No		
Rear Camera	Features	Wide Color Capture	Yes								No					
Rear Camera	Video Recording	Resolution and Frame Rate	4K at 24 fps, 25 fps, 30 fps or 60 fps 1080p HD at 25 fps, 30 fps or 60 fps						4K at 24 fps, 25 fps or 30 fps 1080p HD at 25 fps, 30 fps or 60 fps					1080p HD at 30 fps or 60 fps		1080p HD at 30 fps
Rear Camera	Video Recording	Slo-mo Video	1080p at 120 fps or 240 fps						1080p at 120 fps 720p at 240 fps					720p at 120 fps or 240 fps		720p at 120 fps
Rear Camera	Video Recording	Dolby Vision HDR	No													
Rear Camera	Video Recording	Dual Capture	No													
Rear Camera	Video Recording	Cinematic Mode	No													
Rear Camera	Video Recording	ProRes Video	No													
Rear Camera	Video Recording	ProRes RAW	No													
Rear Camera	Video Recording	Genlock support	No													
Rear Camera	Video Recording	Action Mode	No													
Rear Camera	Video Recording	Macro Video	No													
Rear Camera	Video Recording	ACES	No													
Rear Camera	Video Recording	Apple Log	No													
Rear Camera	Video Recording	Optical Zoom for Video	1x	1x, 2x				1x	1x, 2x	1x						
Rear Camera	Video Recording	Digital Zoom for Video	Up to 3x	Up to 6x				Up to 3x	Up to 6x	Up to 3x						
Rear Camera	Video Recording	Optical Image Stabilization for Video	Lens-shift	Lens-shift (Main and 2x Telephoto)			Lens-shift (Main)	Lens-shift	Lens-shift (Main)	Lens-shift	No	Lens-shift	No			
Rear Camera	Video Recording	Cinematic Video Stabilization	1080p and 720p											Yes		No
Rear Camera	Video Recording	QuickTake Video	iOS 14 and later			No										
Rear Camera	Video Recording	Timelapse Video	With Stabilization													Yes
Rear Camera	Video Recording	Audio Zoom	No													
Rear Camera	Video Recording	Stereo Recording	Yes			No										
Rear Camera	Video Recording	Wind Noise Reduction	No													
Rear Camera	Video Recording	Audio Mix	No													
Front Camera	Camera	Resolution	7 MP TrueDepth				7 MP FaceTime HD				1.2 MP FaceTime HD	5 MP FaceTime HD		1.2 MP FaceTime HD		
Front Camera	Camera	Aperture	f/2.2								f/2.4	f/2.2				f/2.4
Front Camera	Camera	Autofocus	No													
Front Camera	Camera	Auto Image Stabilization	Yes								No					
Front Camera	Camera	Center Stage for photos	No													
Front Camera	Features	HDR for Photos	Smart HDR			Auto HDR			Yes							
Front Camera	Features	Night Mode	No													
Front Camera	Features	Deep Fusion	No													
Front Camera	Features	Photonic Engine	No													
Front Camera	Features	Photographic Styles	No													
Front Camera	Features	Portrait Mode	With Depth Control			Yes	No									
Front Camera	Features	Portrait Lighting	With six effects (Natural, Studio, Contour, Stage, Stage Mono, High‑Key Mono)			With five effects (Natural, Studio, Contour, Stage, Stage Mono)	No									
Front Camera	Features	Animoji and Memoji	Yes				No									
Front Camera	Features	Flash	Retina Flash											—N/a		
Front Camera	Features	Live Photos	Yes								No					
Front Camera	Features	Wide Color Capture	Yes								No					
Front Camera	Video Recording	Resolution and Frame Rate	1080p HD at 25 fps, 30 fps or 60 fps			1080p HD at 25 fps or 30 fps										
Front Camera	Video Recording	Slo-mo Video	—N/a													
Front Camera	Video Recording	Dolby Vision HDR	No													
Front Camera	Video Recording	Dual Capture	No													
Front Camera	Video Recording	Center Stage for Video Calls	No													
Front Camera	Video Recording	Ultra-stabilised video	No													
Front Camera	Video Recording	Cinematic Mode	No													
Front Camera	Video Recording	ProRes Video	No													
Front Camera	Video Recording	Cinematic Video Stabilization	1080p and 720p			No										
Front Camera	Video Recording	Quicktake Video	iOS 14 and later			No										
Front Camera	Video Recording	FaceTime	FaceTime HD (1080p) over Wi‑Fi						Supported							
Audio	Playback		Spatial Audio			Stereo					Mono					
Audio	Dolby Atmos		Built-in speakers and supported headphones			Supported headphones					—N/a					
Audio	Microphone		Yes													
Audio	3.5 mm Jack		No								Yes					
Hearing Aid Compatibility	ANSI C63.19		2011													
Hearing Aid Compatibility	HAC Rating		M3, T4													
Hearing Aid Compatibility	Compatible with Made for iPhone Hearing Aids		Yes													
Power	Battery		3.82 V 11.24 W·h (2,942 mA·h)	3.80 V 12.08 W·h (3,179 mA·h)	3.81 V 10.13 W·h (2,659 mA·h)	3.81 V 10.35 W·h (2,716 mA·h)	3.82 V 10.28 W·h (2,691 mA·h)	3.82 V 6.96 W·h (1,821 mA·h)	3.82 V 11.10 W·h (2,915 mA·h)	3.80 V 7.45 W·h (1,960 mA·h)	3.82 V 6.21 W·h (1,624 mA·h)	3.80 V 10.45 W·h (2,750 mA·h)	3.82 V 6.55 W·h (1,715 mA·h)	3.8 V 11.1 W·h (2,915 mA·h)	3.8 V 6.91 W·h (1,810 mA·h)	3.8 V 5.92 W·h (1,560 mA·h)
Power	Fast Charging		20 W, up to 50% charge in 30 minutes (20 W adapter sold separately)						No							
Power	Wireless Charging		7.5 W Qi						—N/a							
Power	MagSafe Charging		No													

==== 32-bit CPU ====
Model			iPhone 5c	iPhone 5	iPhone 4s	iPhone 4	iPhone 3GS	iPhone 3G	iPhone
Picture									
Basic Info	Hardware Strings		iPhone5,3 iPhone5,4	iPhone5,1 iPhone5,2	iPhone4,1	iPhone3,1 iPhone3,2 iPhone3,3	iPhone2,1	iPhone1,2	iPhone1,1
Basic Info	Model number		A1456; A1507; A1529; A1516; A1526; A1532	A1428; A1429; A1442	A1431; A1387	A1349; A1332	A1325; A1303	A1324; A1241	A1203
Basic Info	Date	Announced	September 10, 2013	September 12, 2012	October 4, 2011	June 7, 2010	June 8, 2009	June 9, 2008	January 9, 2007
Basic Info	Date	Released	16 GB and 32 GB: September 20, 2013; 8 GB: March 18, 2014, and September 9, 2014	September 21, 2012	16 GB, 32 GB, and 64 GB: October 14, 2011; 8 GB: September 20, 2013	16 GB and 32 GB: June 24, 2010; CDMA: February 10, 2011; White: April 28, 2011; 8 GB: October 14, 2011	16 GB and 32 GB: June 19, 2009; 8 GB: June 24, 2010	July 11, 2008	4 GB and 8 GB: June 29, 2007; 16 GB: February 5, 2008
Basic Info	Date	Discontinued	16 GB and 32 GB: September 9, 2014; 8 GB: September 9, 2015	September 10, 2013	32 GB and 64 GB: September 12, 2012; 16 GB: September 10, 2013; 8 GB: September 9, 2014	16 GB and 32 GB: October 4, 2011; 8 GB: September 10, 2013	16 GB and 32 GB: June 24, 2010; 8 GB black: September 12, 2012	16 GB: June 8, 2009; 8 GB black: June 7, 2010	4 GB: September 5, 2007; 8 GB and 16 GB: July 11, 2008
Basic Info	Date	Unsupported	September 19, 2017	September 19, 2017; July 22, 2019 (GPS Update)	September 13, 2016; July 22, 2019 (GPS Update)	September 17, 2014	February 21, 2014	March 9, 2011	June 21, 2010
Basic Info	Operating System	Initial	iOS 7.0	iOS 6.0	iOS 5.0	iOS 4.0 (GSM) iOS 4.2.5 (CDMA)	iPhone OS 3.0	iPhone OS 2.0	iPhone OS 1.0
Basic Info	Operating System	Latest	iOS 10.3.3	iOS 10.3.4	iOS 9.3.6	iOS 7.1.2	iOS 6.1.6	iOS 4.2.1	iPhone OS 3.1.3
Colors							(8 GB, 16 GB and 32 GB) (16 GB and 32 GB)	(8 GB and 16 GB) (16 GB)	
Materials	Front		Glass front						
Materials	Back		Polycarbonate back	Aluminum back	Glass back		Plastic back		Aluminum and plastic back
Materials	Side		Polycarbonate sides	Aluminum sides	Stainless steel sides		Plastic sides		Aluminum and plastic sides
Resistant			No						
Secure Authentication	Touch ID		No						
Secure Authentication	Face ID		No						
Buttons	Action Button		Ring / Silence switch						
Buttons	Camera Control		No						
Dimensions	Height		124.4 mm (4.90 in)	123.8 mm (4.87 in)	115.2 mm (4.54 in)		115.5 mm (4.55 in)		115 mm (4.5 in)
Dimensions	Width		59.2 mm (2.33 in)	58.6 mm (2.31 in)			62.1 mm (2.44 in)		61 mm (2.4 in)
Dimensions	Depth		8.97 mm (0.353 in)	7.6 mm (0.30 in)	9.3 mm (0.37 in)		12.3 mm (0.48 in)		11.6 mm (0.46 in)
Dimensions	Weight		132 g (4.7 oz)	112 g (4.0 oz)	140 g (4.9 oz)	137 g (4.8 oz)	135 g (4.8 oz)	133 g (4.7 oz)	135 g (4.8 oz)
Display	Size	Diagonal	4 in (100 mm)		3.5 in (89 mm)				
Display	Size	Vertical-by-Horizontal	3.5 by 1.9 in (89 by 48 mm)		2.9 by 1.9 in (74 by 48 mm)				
Display	Resolution	Vertical-by-Horizontal	640 × 1136		640 × 960		320 × 480		
Display	Resolution	Density	326 ppi				163 ppi		
Display	Resolution	Aspect Ratio	16:9		3:2				
Display	Multi-touch		Yes						
Display	Technology		Retina display widescreen with IPS technology				Widescreen with TN technology		
Display	Backlight		LED-backlit						
Display	Dynamic Island		No						
Display	Refresh Rate	Minimum	60 Hz						
Display	Refresh Rate	Maximum	60 Hz						
Display	Refresh Rate	ProMotion Display	No						
Display	Refresh Rate	Always-On Display	No						
Display	Brightness and Contrast	Typical Max brightness	500 nits				?		
Display	Brightness and Contrast	HDR Max brightness	—N/a						
Display	Brightness and Contrast	Outdoor Max brightness	—N/a						
Display	Brightness and Contrast	Minimum brightness	—N/a						
Display	Brightness and Contrast	Contrast ratio (typical)	800:1				200:1		
Display	Brightness and Contrast	HDR Display	No						
Display	Brightness and Contrast	HDR 10 Content	No						
Display	Brightness and Contrast	Dolby Vision Content	No						
Display	Color	Full sRGB	Yes		No				
Display	Color	Wide Color (P3)	No						
Display	Color	True Tone	No						
Display	Color	Night Shift	No						
Display	Fingerprint-resistant oleophobic coating		Yes					No	
Display	Anti-reflective coating		No						
Display	Taptic		No						
Performance	Chip	Chip Name	Apple A6		Apple A5	Apple A4	Samsung S5PC100	Samsung S5L8900	
Performance	Chip	Technology Node	32 nm		45 nm		65 nm	90 nm	
Performance	Chip	Bit	32-bit						
Performance	Chip	Total Cores	2			1			
Performance	Chip	High-performance Cores	2 × 1.3 GHz		800 MHz	600 MHz		412 MHz	
Performance	Chip	Energy-efficiency Cores	—N/a						
Performance	Chip	Graphics Processor	PowerVR SGX543 3-core GPU		PowerVR SGX543 2-core GPU	PowerVR SGX543 1-core GPU	PowerVR SGX535 1-core GPU	PowerVR MBX Lite 1-core GPU	
Performance	Chip	GPU Family	—N/a						
Performance	Chip	Hardware-accelerated Ray Tracing	No						
Performance	Chip	Neural Accelerators in GPU	No						
Performance	Chip	Neural Engine	—N/a						
Performance	Chip	Apple Intelligence	No						
Performance	Chip	Visual Intelligence	No						
Performance	RAM	RAM Size	1 GB		512 MB		256 MB	128 MB	
Performance	RAM	RAM Width	32-bit					16-bit	
Performance	RAM	RAM Type	LPDDR2-1066 (533 MHz)		LPDDR2-800 (400 MHz)	LPDDR-400 (200 MHz)		LPDDR-266 (133 MHz)	
Performance	RAM	RAM Bandwidth	4.3 GB/s		3.2 GB/s	1.6 GB/s		533 MB/s	
Performance	Storage	Storage Size	NAND Flash driven by eMMC-based controller						
Performance	Storage	Storage Type	8 GB; 16 GB; 32 GB	16 GB; 32 GB; 64 GB	8 GB; 16 GB; 32 GB; 64 GB	8 GB; 16 GB; 32 GB		8 GB; 16 GB	4 GB; 8 GB; 16 GB
Connector	Connector Type		8-pin Lightning connector port supporting charging		30-pin connector port supporting charging				
Connector	Data Transfer Speed		Up to 0.48 Gbit/s (USB 2.0)						
Connector	External Display Support		No						
Connectivity	Wi-Fi		Wi-Fi 4 (802.11a/b/g/n); 802.11n in 2.4 GHz and 5 GHz		Wi-Fi 4 (802.11b/g/n); 802.11n in 2.4 GHz		Wi-Fi (802.11b/g)		
Connectivity	MIMO		No						
Connectivity	Bluetooth		Bluetooth 4.0			Bluetooth 2.1		Bluetooth 2.0	
Connectivity	Thread networking technology		No						
Connectivity	NFC		No						
Connectivity	Express Cards		No						
Connectivity	Ultra Wideband Chip		No						
Connectivity	Cellular	Modem	Qualcomm MDM9615M		Qualcomm MDM6610	Qualcomm MDM6600; Infineon XMM 6180	Infineon PMB8878		Infineon PMB8876
Connectivity	Cellular	GSM/EDGE	Yes						
Connectivity	Cellular	UMTS/HSPA+	Yes						No
Connectivity	Cellular	DC-HSDPA	Yes		No				
Connectivity	Cellular	CDMA	CDMA EV-DO Rev. A and Rev. B		CDMA EV-DO Rev. A	CDMA EV-DO Rev. A (CDMA models)	No		
Connectivity	Cellular	4G/LTE	Yes		No				
Connectivity	Cellular	5G	No						
Connectivity	VoLTE								
Connectivity	SIM Card	Form Factor	Nano-SIM		Micro-SIM		Mini-SIM		
Connectivity	SIM Card	e-SIM							
Connectivity	SIM Card	Dual SIM	Not supported						
Connectivity	SIM Card	Dual SIM	Not supported						
Connectivity	GPS	GPS	Yes						
Connectivity	GPS	GLONASS/GNSS	Yes			No			
Connectivity	GPS	Galileo	No						
Connectivity	GPS	QZSS	No						
Connectivity	GPS	BeiDou	No						
Connectivity	GPS	NavIC	No						
Safety	Emergency SOS		Yes						
Safety	Emergency SOS Satellite		No						
Safety	Crash Detection		No						
Sensors	LiDAR		No						
Sensors	Proximity Sensor								
Sensors	Gyro		Yes			No			
Sensors	Accelerometer		Yes						
Sensors	Ambient Light Sensor		Yes						
Sensors	Barometer		No						
Rear Camera	Camera	Resolution	8 MP			5 MP	3 MP	2 MP	
Rear Camera	Camera	Super High Resolution Support	No						
Rear Camera	Camera	Aperture	f/2.4			f/2.8			
Rear Camera	Camera	Focal Length	33 mm		35 mm		?		
Rear Camera	Camera	Pixel Size	1.5 μm			1.75 μm		2.2 μm	
Rear Camera	Camera	Sensor Size	1/2.94"			1/3.2"	1/4"		
Rear Camera	Camera	Optical Image Stabilization	No						
Rear Camera	Camera	Auto Image Stabilization	No						
Rear Camera	Camera	Element Lens	Five-element lens			Four-element lens	?		
Rear Camera	Camera	Autofocus	Yes			No			
Rear Camera	Camera	Optical Zoom	1x						
Rear Camera	Camera	Digital Zoom	Up to 5x						
Rear Camera	Camera	Lens Cover	Sapphire crystal lens cover		—N/a				
Rear Camera	Features	HDR for Photos	No						
Rear Camera	Features	Night Mode	No						
Rear Camera	Features	Deep Fusion	No						
Rear Camera	Features	Photonic Engine	No						
Rear Camera	Features	Macro photos	No						
Rear Camera	Features	Photographic Styles	No						
Rear Camera	Features	Portrait Mode	No						
Rear Camera	Features	Portrait Lighting	No						
Rear Camera	Features	Spatial Photos	No						
Rear Camera	Features	Apple ProRAW	No						
Rear Camera	Features	Panorama	Up to 28 MP		Up to 28 MP iOS 6 and later	—N/a			
Rear Camera	Features	Burst Mode	No						
Rear Camera	Features	Flash	LED Flash				—N/a		
Rear Camera	Features	Live Photos	No						
Rear Camera	Features	Wide Color Capture	No						
Rear Camera	Video Recording	Resolution and Frame Rate	1080p HD at 30 fps			720p HD at 30 fps	480p at 30 fps	—N/a	
Rear Camera	Video Recording	Slo-mo Video	—N/a						
Rear Camera	Video Recording	Dolby Vision HDR	No						
Rear Camera	Video Recording	Dual Capture	No						
Rear Camera	Video Recording	Cinematic Mode	No						
Rear Camera	Video Recording	ProRes Video	No						
Rear Camera	Video Recording	ProRes RAW	No						
Rear Camera	Video Recording	Genlock support	No						
Rear Camera	Video Recording	Action Mode	No						
Rear Camera	Video Recording	Macro Video	No						
Rear Camera	Video Recording	ACES	No						
Rear Camera	Video Recording	Apple Log	No						
Rear Camera	Video Recording	Optical Zoom for Video	1x					—N/a	
Rear Camera	Video Recording	Digital Zoom for Video	Up to 3x					—N/a	
Rear Camera	Video Recording	Optical Image Stabilization for Video	No						
Rear Camera	Video Recording	Cinematic Video Stabilization	No						
Rear Camera	Video Recording	QuickTake Video	No						
Rear Camera	Video Recording	Timelapse Video	No						
Rear Camera	Video Recording	Audio Zoom	No						
Rear Camera	Video Recording	Stereo Recording	No						
Rear Camera	Video Recording	Wind Noise Reduction	No						
Rear Camera	Video Recording	Audio Mix	No						
Front Camera	Camera	Resolution	1.2 MP FaceTime HD		0.3 MP		—N/a		
Front Camera	Camera	Aperture	f/2.4				—N/a		
Front Camera	Camera	Autofocus	No						
Front Camera	Camera	Auto Image Stabilization	No						
Front Camera	Camera	Center Stage for photos	No						
Front Camera	Features	HDR for Photos	No						
Front Camera	Features	Night Mode	No						
Front Camera	Features	Deep Fusion	No						
Front Camera	Features	Photonic Engine	No						
Front Camera	Features	Photographic Styles	No						
Front Camera	Features	Portrait Mode	No						
Front Camera	Features	Portrait Lighting	No						
Front Camera	Features	Animoji and Memoji	No						
Front Camera	Features	Flash	—N/a						
Front Camera	Features	Live Photos	No						
Front Camera	Features	Wide Color Capture	No						
Front Camera	Video Recording	Resolution and Frame Rate	720p HD at 30 fps		480p at 30 fps		—N/a		
Front Camera	Video Recording	Slo-mo Video	—N/a						
Front Camera	Video Recording	Dolby Vision HDR	No						
Front Camera	Video Recording	Dual Capture	No						
Front Camera	Video Recording	Center Stage for Video Calls	No						
Front Camera	Video Recording	Ultra-stabilized video	No						
Front Camera	Video Recording	Cinematic Mode	No						
Front Camera	Video Recording	ProRes Video	No						
Front Camera	Video Recording	Cinematic Video Stabilization	No						
Front Camera	Video Recording	Quicktake Video	No						
Front Camera	Video Recording	FaceTime	Yes				No		
Audio	Playback		Mono						
Audio	Dolby Atmos		—N/a						
Audio	Microphone		Yes						
Audio	3.5 mm Jack		Yes						
Hearing Aid Compatibility	ANSI C63.19		2011		—N/a	2007	—N/a		
Hearing Aid Compatibility	HAC Rating		M3, T4	M3, T4 (GSM Model); M4, T4 (CDMA Model)	—N/a	M3, T3 (2G); M4, T4 (3G and CDMA Model)	—N/a		
Hearing Aid Compatibility	Compatible with Made for iPhone Hearing Aids		Yes				No		
Power	Battery		3.8 V 5.73 W·h (1,510 mA·h)	3.8 V 5.45 W·h (1,440 mA·h)	3.7 V 5.3 W·h (1,432 mA·h)	3.7 V 5.25 W·h (1,420 mA·h)	3.7 V 4.51 W·h (1,219 mA·h)	3.7 V 4.12 W·h (1,150 mA·h)	3.7 V 5.18 W·h (1,400 mA·h)
Power	Fast Charging		No						
Power	Wireless Charging		No						
Power	MagSafe Charging		No						
Total greenhouse gas emissions			60 kg CO_{2}e	75 kg CO_{2}e	70 kg CO_{2}e; 55 kg CO_{2}e	45 kg CO_{2}e	55 kg CO_{2}e	55 kg CO_{2}e	—N/a

== iPhone systems-on-chips ==
System-on-chip	RAM	RAM type	Storage type	Model	Highest supported iOS
A20 Pro	12 GB	LPDDR5X 4800 MHz	NVMe NAND	iPhone 18 Pro / 18 Pro Max / iPhone Duo	Latest iOS iOS 27.2.1
A19 Pro	12 GB	LPDDR5X 4800 MHz	NVMe NAND	iPhone 17 Pro / 17 Pro Max	Latest iOS iOS 27.2.1
A19 Pro	12 GB	LPDDR5X 4266 MHz	NVMe NAND	iPhone Air	Latest iOS iOS 27.2.1
A19	8 GB	LPDDR5X 4266 MHz	NVMe NAND	iPhone 17 / iPhone 17e	Latest iOS iOS 27.2.1
A18 Pro	8 GB	LPDDR5X 3750 MHz	NVMe NAND	iPhone 16 Pro / 16 Pro Max	Latest iOS iOS 27.2.1
A18	8 GB	LPDDR5X 3750 MHz	NVMe NAND	iPhone 16 / 16 Plus / iPhone 16e	Latest iOS iOS 27.2.1
A17 Pro	8 GB	LPDDR5 3200 MHz	NVMe NAND	iPhone 15 Pro / 15 Pro Max	Latest iOS iOS 27.2.1
A16 Bionic	6 GB	LPDDR5 3200 MHz	NVMe NAND	iPhone 15 / 15 Plus iPhone 14 Pro / 14 Pro Max	Latest iOS iOS 27.2.1
A15 Bionic	6 GB	LPDDR4X 2133 MHz	NVMe NAND	iPhone 14 / 14 Plus iPhone 13 Pro / 13 Pro Max	Latest iOS iOS 27.2.1
A15 Bionic	4 GB	LPDDR4X 2133 MHz	NVMe NAND	iPhone SE (3rd gen) iPhone 13 / 13 Mini	Latest iOS iOS 27.2.1
A14 Bionic	6 GB	LPDDR4X 2133 MHz	NVMe NAND	iPhone 12 Pro / 12 Pro Max	Latest iOS iOS 27.2.1
A14 Bionic	4 GB	LPDDR4X 2133 MHz	NVMe NAND	iPhone 12 / 12 mini	Latest iOS iOS 27.2.1
A13 Bionic	3 GB	LPDDR4X 2133 MHz	NVMe NAND	iPhone SE (2nd gen)	Latest iOS iOS 27.2.1
A13 Bionic	4 GB	LPDDR4X 2133 MHz	NVMe NAND	iPhone 11 iPhone 11 Pro / 11 Pro Max	Latest iOS iOS 27.2.1
A12 Bionic	3 GB	LPDDR4X 2133 MHz	NVMe NAND	iPhone XR	iOS 18.7.12
A12 Bionic	4 GB	LPDDR4X 2133 MHz	NVMe NAND	iPhone XS / XS Max	iOS 18.7.12
A11 Bionic	3 GB	LPDDR4X 2133 MHz	NVMe NAND	iPhone X / 8 Plus	iOS 16.7.16
A11 Bionic	2 GB	LPDDR4X 2133 MHz	NVMe NAND	iPhone 8	iOS 16.7.16
A10 Fusion	3 GB	LPDDR4 1600 MHz	NVMe NAND	iPhone 7 Plus	iOS 15.8.8
A10 Fusion	2 GB	LPDDR4 1600 MHz	NVMe NAND	iPhone 7	iOS 15.8.8
A9	2 GB	LPDDR4 1600 MHz	NVMe NAND	iPhone 6s / 6s Plus iPhone SE (1st gen)	iOS 15.8.8
A8	1 GB	LPDDR3 800 MHz	eMMC	iPhone 6 / 6 Plus	iOS 12.5.8
A7	1 GB	LPDDR3 800 MHz	eMMC	iPhone 5s	iOS 12.5.8
A6	1 GB	LPDDR2 533 MHz	eMMC	iPhone 5 iPhone 5c	iOS 10.3.4 (iPhone 5) iOS 10.3.3 (iPhone 5c)
A5	512 MB	LPDDR2 400 MHz	eMMC	iPhone 4s	iOS 9.3.6
A4	512 MB	LPDDR 200 MHz	eMMC	iPhone 4	iOS 7.1.2
APL0298	256 MB	LPDDR 200 MHz	eMMC	iPhone 3GS	iOS 6.1.6
APL0098	128 MB	LPDDR 133 MHz	eMMC	iPhone 3G	iOS 4.2.1
APL0098	128 MB	LPDDR 133 MHz	eMMC	iPhone (1st gen)	iPhone OS 3.1.3

== Timeline ==
Timeline of iPhone models
See also: List of Apple products

Source: Apple Newsroom Archive

== See also ==
- List of iPad models
- iOS version history
- iPod Touch
- Apple TV
- Apple Watch
- iPhone (disambiguation)
