= IPhone Pro =

iPhone Pro may refer to:

- iPhone 11 Pro, released in 2019
- iPhone 12 Pro, released in 2020
- iPhone 13 Pro, released in 2021
- iPhone 14 Pro, released in 2022
- iPhone 15 Pro, released in 2023
- iPhone 16 Pro, released in 2024
- iPhone 17 Pro, released in 2025
- iPhone 18 Pro, released in 2026
