= Apple A15 =

System-on-a-chip designed by Apple Inc.

Apple A15 Bionic
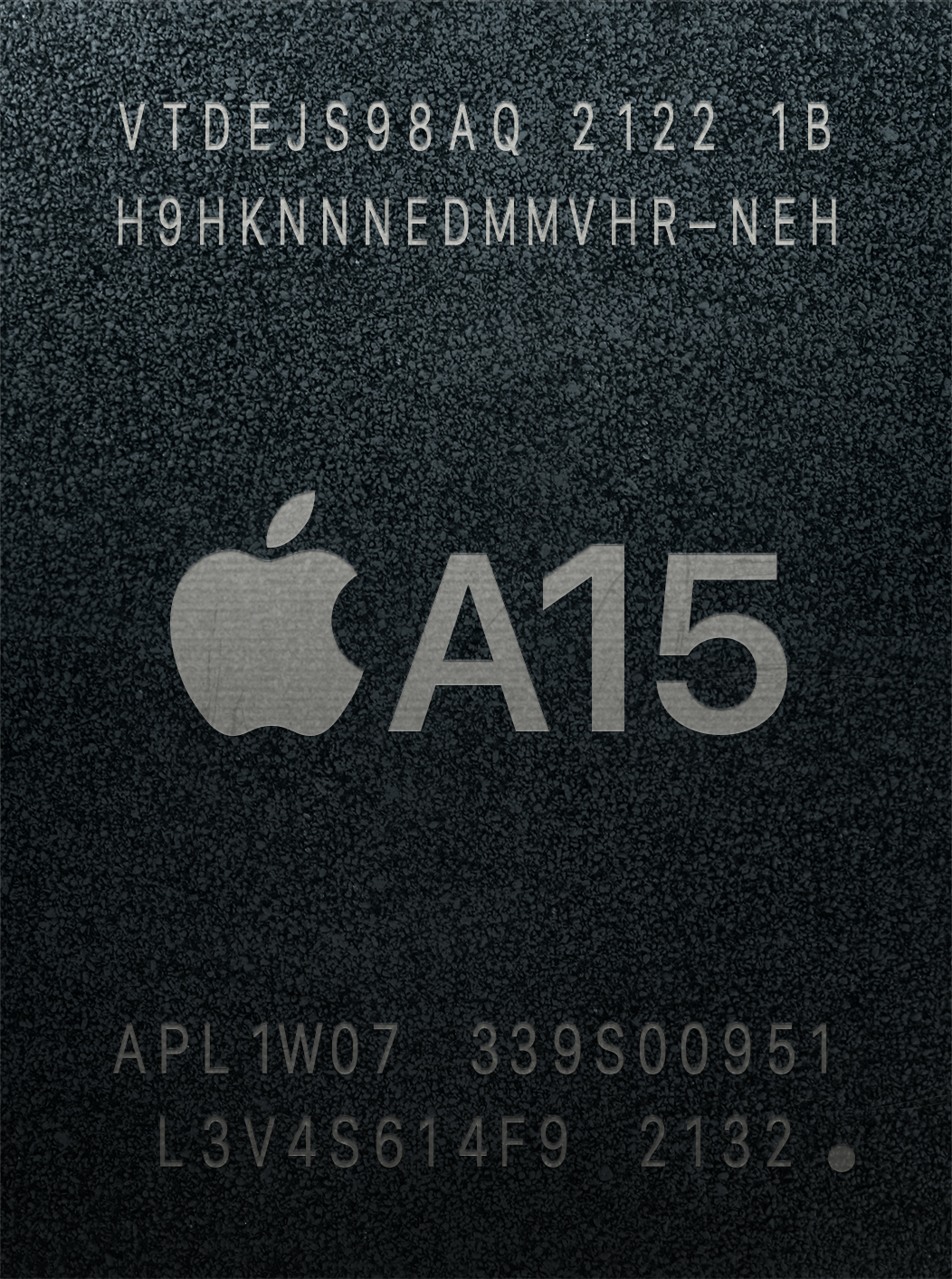

General information
- Launched: September 14, 2021
- Discontinued: October 13, 2026
- Designed by: Apple Inc.
- Common manufacturer: TSMC
- Product code: APL1W07
- Max. CPU clock rate: to 3.23 GHz (2.93 GHz in iPad Mini 6)

Physical specifications
- Transistors: 15 billion
- Cores: 6 (4 efficiency, 2 performance)
- GPU: Apple-designed 4- or 5- core GPU

Cache
- L2 cache: 12 MB (performance cores); 4 MB (efficient cores)
- Last level cache: 32 MB (system cache)

Architecture and classification
- Application: Mobile
- Technology node: 5 nm (TSMC N5P)
- Microarchitecture: "Avalanche" and "Blizzard"
- Instruction set: ARMv8.6-A

Products, models, variants
- Variant: Apple M2

History
- Predecessor: Apple A14 Bionic
- Successors: Apple A16 Bionic (iPhone 14 Pro, iPhone 14 Pro Max, iPad 11th Generation, iPhone 15, iPhone 15 Plus), Apple A18 (iPhone 16e)

The Apple A15 Bionic is a 64-bit ARM-based system on a chip (SoC) designed by Apple Inc., part of the Apple silicon series. It was first used in the iPhone 13 and 13 Mini, iPhone 13 Pro and 13 Pro Max and iPad Mini (6th generation), and later in the iPhone SE (3rd generation), Apple TV 4K (3rd generation), and iPhone 14 and 14 Plus.

== Design ==
The Apple A15 Bionic features an Apple-designed 64-bit six-core CPU implementing ARMv8 with two high-performance cores called Avalanche running at 3.24 GHz and four energy-efficient cores called Blizzard running at 2.01 GHz. Apple claims the A15 in the iPhones is 50% faster than the competition. Apple claims the A15 in the iPad Mini 6 is 40% faster than the A12. An in-depth breakdown by Anandtech revealed that "compared to the A14, the new A15 increases the peak single-core frequency of the two-performance core cluster by 8%, now reaching up to 3240MHz compared to the 2998MHz of the previous generation. When both performance cores are active, their operating frequency goes up by 10%, both now running at 3180MHz compared to the previous generation's 2890MHz".

The A15 contains 15 billion transistors, a 27.1% increase from the A14's transistor count of 11.8 billion. It includes dedicated neural network hardware that Apple calls a new 16-core Neural Engine. The Neural Engine can perform 15.8 trillion operations per second, faster than A14's 11 trillion operations per second (+ 43%). The A15 also includes a new image processor (ISP) with improved computational photography capabilities. Apple also boosted performance by doubling the system cache to 32MB.

The A15 has video codec encoding support for HEVC, H.264, and ProRes (iPhone 13 Pro only). It has decoding support for HEVC, H.264, MPEG‑4 Part 2, ProRes, and Motion JPEG.

A15 is manufactured by TSMC, reportedly on their second-generation 5 nm fabrication process, N5P.

== GPU ==
The A15 integrates an Apple-designed five-core GPU for the iPad mini (6th generation), iPhone 13 Pro and 13 Pro Max, iPhone 14 and 14 Plus and Apple TV 4K (3rd generation), though in the Apple TV variant one efficiency CPU core is disabled. One GPU core is disabled in the iPhone SE (3rd generation), and iPhone 13 and 13 Mini, resulting in a four-core GPU for these models.

== Products ==
Products that include the Apple A15 Bionic are:

- iPhone 13 and 13 Mini – 6-core CPU and 4-core GPU
- iPhone 13 Pro & 13 Pro Max – 6-core CPU and 5-core GPU
- iPhone SE (3rd generation) – 6-core CPU and 4-core GPU
- iPhone 14 and 14 Plus – 6-core CPU and 5-core GPU
- iPad Mini (6th generation) – 5-core GPU; CPU underclocked to 2.92 GHz from 3.23 GHz
- Apple TV 4K (3rd generation) – 5-core GPU and 5-core CPU (Binned A15 with 1 efficiency CPU core disabled)

== Variants ==
The table below shows the various SoCs based on the "Avalanche" and "Blizzard" microarchitectures.

| Variant | CPU cores (P+E)* | GPU cores | GPU EU | Graphics ALU | Neural Engine cores | Neural Engine performance | Memory (GB) | Transistor count |
|---|---|---|---|---|---|---|---|---|
| A15 Bionic | 5 (2+3) | 5 | 80 | 640 | 16 | 15.8 TOPS | 4 | 15 billion |
| A15 Bionic | 6 (2+4) | 4 | 64 | 512 | 16 | 15.8 TOPS | 4 | 15 billion |
| A15 Bionic | 6 (2+4) | 5 | 80 | 640 | 16 | 15.8 TOPS | 4-6 | 15 billion |
| M2 | 8 (4+4) | 8 | 128 | 1024 | 16 | 15.8 TOPS | 8–24 | 20 billion |
| M2 | 8 (4+4) | 10 | 160 | 1280 | 16 | 15.8 TOPS | 8–24 | 20 billion |
| M2 Pro | 10 (6+4) | 16 | 256 | 2048 | 16 | 15.8 TOPS | 16–32 | 40 billion |
| M2 Pro | 12 (8+4) | 16 | 256 | 2048 | | 15.8 TOPS | 16–32 | 40 billion |
| M2 Pro | 12 (8+4) | 19 | 304 | 2432 | 16 | 15.8 TOPS | 16–32 | 40 billion |
| M2 Max | 12 (8+4) | 30 | 480 | 3840 | 16 | 15.8 TOPS | 32–96 | 67 billion |
| M2 Max | 12 (8+4) | 38 | 608 | 4864 | 16 | 15.8 TOPS | 32–96 | 67 billion |
| M2 Ultra | 24 (16+8) | 60 | 960 | 7680 | 32 | 31.6 TOPS | 64–192 | 134 billion |
| M2 Ultra | 24 (16+8) | 76 | 1216 | 9728 | 32 | 31.6 TOPS | 64–192 | 134 billion |

* (Performance + Power efficiency)

== See also ==
- Apple silicon, range of ARM-based processors designed by Apple for their products
- Comparison of Armv8-A processors

| Preceded by Apple A14 Bionic | Apple A15 Bionic; 2021 | Succeeded by Apple A16 Bionic |
