= IPhone 14 Pro =

2022 smartphone by Apple

iPhone 14 Pro iPhone 14 Pro Max

- iPhone 14 Pro in Deep Purple
- Developer: Apple
- Type: Smartphone
- Series: iPhone Pro
- First released: September 16, 2022; 4 years ago
- Availability by region: September 16, 2022: Australia; Austria; Belgium; Canada; China; Czech Republic; Denmark; Finland; France; Germany; Hong Kong; Hungary; India; Italy; Ireland; Japan; Luxembourg; Mexico; Netherlands; New Zealand; Norway; Poland; Portugal; Serbia; Singapore; Somalia; Spain; Sweden; Switzerland; Taiwan; Thailand; United Arab Emirates; United Kingdom; United States; September 22, 2022: Israel; September 23, 2022: Bahrain; Malaysia; Turkey; October 7, 2022: South Korea; October 14, 2022: Brazil; Philippines; Vietnam; October 18, 2022: Bangladesh; Israel; October 28, 2022: Nigeria; November 4, 2022: Indonesia; February 10, 2023: Colombia
- Discontinued: September 12, 2023; 3 years ago
- Predecessor: iPhone 13 Pro and Pro Max
- Successor: iPhone 15 Pro and Pro Max
- Related: iPhone 14 and 14 Plus
- Compatible networks: GSM/EDGE, UMTS/HSPA+, 4G LTE, 5G NR
- Form factor: Slate
- Colors: Deep Purple; Gold; Silver; Space Black
- Dimensions: Pro: H: 147.5 mm (5.81 in); W: 71.5 mm (2.81 in); D: 7.85 mm (0.309 in); Pro Max: H: 160.7 mm (6.33 in); W: 77.6 mm (3.06 in); D: 7.85 mm (0.309 in)
- Weight: Pro: 206 g (7.3 oz); Pro Max: 240 g (8.5 oz)
- Operating system: Original: iOS 16; Current: iOS 27.2, released October 26, 2026
- System-on-chip: Apple A16 Bionic
- Modem: Qualcomm Snapdragon X65 5G
- Memory: 6 GB LPDDR5
- Storage: 128 GB, 256 GB, 512 GB or 1 TB NVMe
- SIM: Dual eSIM (US); Dual nano-SIM (Hong Kong, Macau, mainland China); nano-SIM and eSIM (elsewhere)
- Battery: 14 Pro: 12.38 Wh (3,200 mAh) Li-ion @ 3.87 V; 14 Pro Max: 16.68 Wh (4,323 mAh) Li-ion @ 3.86 V
- Charging: MagSafe (up to 15 W) and Qi (7.5 W) wireless charging; Wired 27–29 W charging via Lightning (fast-charging capable)
- Rear camera: 48 MP, f/1.78, 24 mm (main), 1/1.28", 1.22 μm – 2.44 μm binned, dual pixel PDAF, Second generation sensor-shift OIS; 12 MP, f/2.8, 77 mm (telephoto), 1/3.4", 1.0 μm, PDAF, OIS, 3x optical zoom; 12 MP, f/2.2, 13 mm (ultrawide), 1/2.55", 1.4 μm, dual pixel PDAF; TOF 3D LiDAR scanner (depth); Adaptive True Tone flash with grid of 9 LEDs, HDR (photo/panorama/video); 4K @ 24/25/30/60 fps, 1080p @ 25/30/60/120/240 fps, 10 bit HDR, Dolby Vision HDR (up to 60 fps); stereo
- Front camera: 12 MP, ƒ/1.9 aperture, autofocus with Focus Pixels Six‑element lens; SL 3D (depth/biometrics sensor); 4K @ 24/30/60 fps, 1080p @ 30/60/120 fps; gyro-EIS
- Display: 14 Pro: 6.1 in (155 mm) 2556 × 1179 resolution, 19.5:9 ratio (~460 ppi density); Super Retina XDR OLED, HDR10, 1,000 nits (typical), 2,000 nits (peak); supplied by Samsung Display; 14 Pro Max: 6.7 in (170 mm); 2796 × 1290 resolution, 19.5:9 ratio (~460 ppi density); Super Retina XDR OLED, HDR10, 1,000 nits (typical), 2,000 nits (peak); supplied by Samsung Display and LG Display
- Sound: 32-bit/384 kHz audio, active noise cancellation with dedicated mic
- Connectivity: Wi-Fi 6, dual-band, hotspot; Bluetooth 5.3 LE; LEO satellite (Globalstar, limited); Dual-frequency GPS (L1, L5), GLONASS, Galileo, QZSS, BeiDou
- Data inputs: List of inputs: Multi-touch screen; LiDAR scanner; 3 microphones; Motion coprocessor; 3-axis gyroscope; 3-axis accelerometer; iBeacon; Barometer; Digital compass; Proximity sensor; Ambient light sensor; Face ID
- Water resistance: IP68 dust and water resistant (up to 6 m for 30 min)
- Hearing aid compatibility: M3, T4
- Other: FaceTime Audio or Video at 1080p over Wi-Fi and 5G, Voice over LTE
- Website: iPhone 14 Pro and iPhone 14 Pro Max at the Wayback Machine (archived September 8, 2022)

The iPhone 14 Pro and iPhone 14 Pro Max are smartphones that were developed and marketed by Apple. They are the sixteenth-generation flagship iPhones, succeeding the iPhone 13 Pro and Pro Max. The devices were unveiled alongside the iPhone 14 and 14 Plus during the Apple Event at Apple Park in Cupertino, California, on September 7, 2022, and were made available on September 16, 2022.

Unlike the iPhone 14 and 14 Plus, the iPhone 14 Pro and iPhone 14 Pro Max are the first iPhones to have a type of display cutout, officially called the "Dynamic Island", which consists of an Android-like punch-hole on the right for the selfie camera, and a pill on the left for the TrueDepth camera array and Face ID sensors, replacing the older "static" notch design that has been in use since the iPhone X was introduced. Along with the iPhone 14, iPhone 14 Pro models add bidirectional satellite connectivity to contact emergency services when out of range of Wi-Fi and cellular networks. They are also the first iPhones to feature an "always-on display".

Along with the iPhone 14 and 14 Plus, the iPhone 14 and iPhone 14 Pro Max are the last iPhones to simultaneously feature both the Lightning port and the Ring/Silent switch, as their successors, the iPhone 15 Pro and 15 Pro Max, replaced Lightning with USB-C and introduced the Action Button, unlike the iPhone 15 and 15 Plus, which continued to feature the Ring/Silent switch but still replaced Lightning with USB-C. iPhone 14 Pro models (as well as the iPhone 14 models) sold in the United States dropped support for physical SIM cards, making them the first iPhone models since the CDMA variant of the iPhone 4 to lack a discrete SIM card reader. Models sold outside the United States retain a single nano-SIM slot and support two eSIM (except the China and Hong Kong models).

== History ==
The development of the iPhone 14 Pro was the subject of months of speculation before the announcement of the iPhone 13 Pro. Reports as early as September 2021 suggested that the next iPhone would feature a hole-punch display. Reports of the iPhone 14 Pro would later be known in January 2022, where the iPhone 14 Pro would feature pill-shaped and circular cutouts on the display, and a 48-megapixel camera.

In February 2022, trial production for the iPhone 14 Pro was started, suggesting that Apple had finalized its design and that the phone would enter early stages of manufacturing.

Multiple reports of the iPhone 14 Pro would later be known in May 2022, including schematics for the iPhone 14 Pro and Pro Max, leaked display panels, and features like Always-on display. Early reports of production began to surface in June 2022 with components being supplied to Foxconn.

In August 2022, reports confirm that the iPhone 14 Pro would be unveiled on September 7, 2022. Images were posted showing a real iPhone 14 Pro with display cutouts, along with status bar items.

On August 24, 2022, Apple officially sent out invites for the next Apple event set for September 7, 2022 with the tagline "Far Out".

The iPhone 14 Pro and Pro Max were announced during the Apple event on September 7, 2022 with new features like a Dynamic Island, Always-on display and a 48-megapixel camera. Pre-orders started on September 9, 2022 and were made available on September 16, 2022.

On November 6, 2022, COVID-19 affected product assembly in Chinese factories, resulting in longer shipment times for some customers.

On September 12, 2023, Apple discontinued and removed the iPhone 14 Pro and iPhone 14 Pro Max from their official website following the announcement of the iPhone 15 Pro and 15 Pro Max as their successors.

In May 2024, Apple began selling refurbished iPhone 14 Pro models on their website.

== Design ==
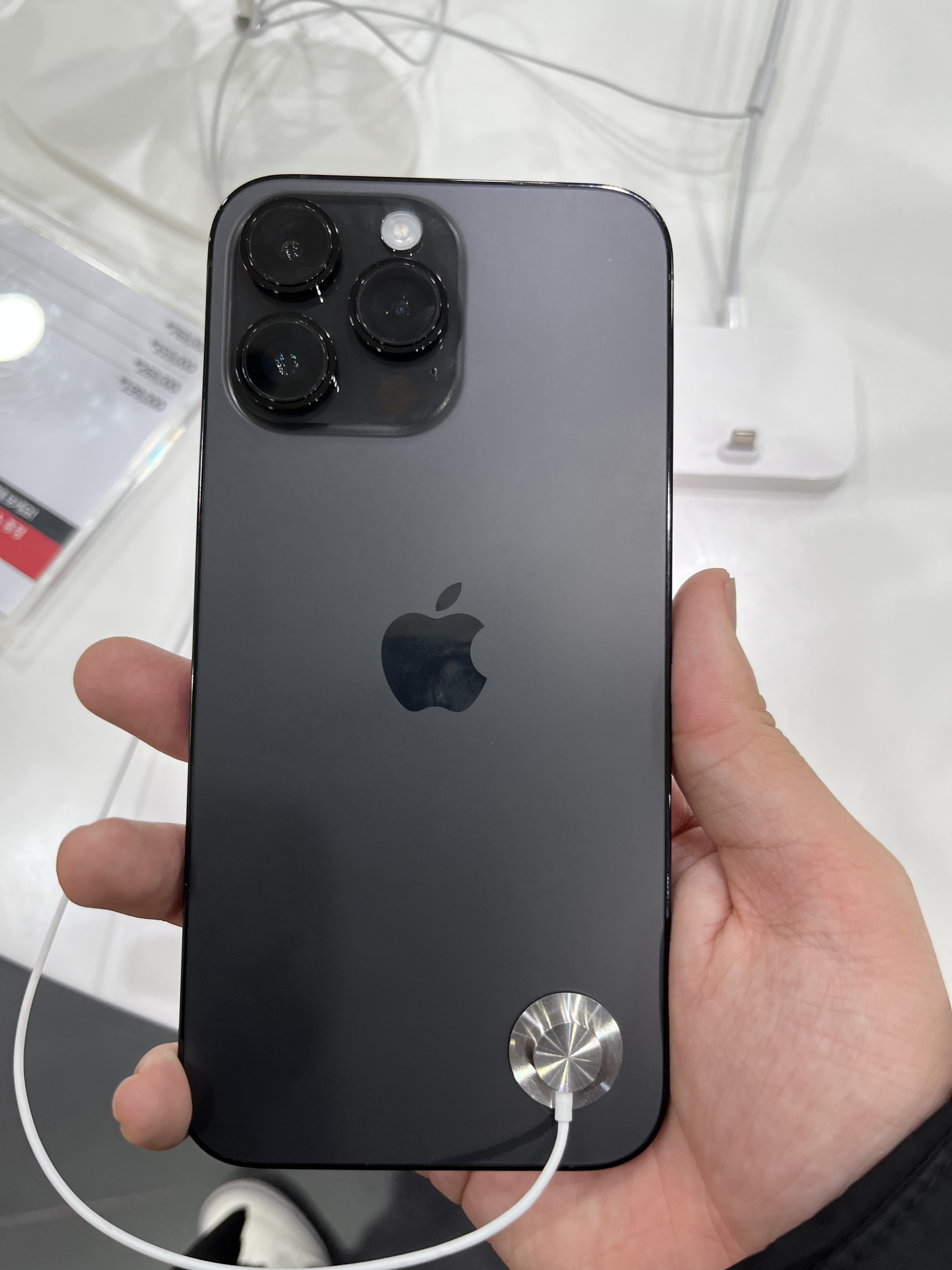
Back of the iPhone 14 Pro Max in Space Black

The chassis of the iPhone 14 Pro and iPhone 14 Pro Max is almost identical to older iPhone models, such as the iPhone 12 Pro and 13 Pro. The display has been updated with a new cutout called the Dynamic Island. The Dynamic Island is a shifting screen cutout that adapts to and displays content. The iPhone 14 Pro and 14 Pro Max are available in four colors: Silver, Space Black, Gold and Deep Purple. Deep Purple replaced the Sierra Blue color used on the iPhone 13 Pro and iPhone 13 Pro Max.

It is the final iPhone model in the exterior design to come with the stainless steel form factor along with the gold color option.

The iPhone 14 Pro and iPhone 14 Pro Max are available in four colors: Space Black, Silver, Gold, and Deep Purple.

Color	Name
	Space Black
	Silver
	Gold
	Deep Purple

== Specifications ==
=== Hardware ===
==== Chipset ====
The iPhone 14 Pro and Pro Max feature a new A16 Bionic system on a chip (SoC), built on TSMC's N4 fabrication process, superseding the A15 Bionic seen on the iPhone 13 and 13 Pro lineup, the 3rd generation iPhone SE, and the iPhone 14 and 14 Plus.

==== Camera ====
The camera sensors and lenses on the main and ultra-wide cameras have been upgraded. The main camera features a new 48-megapixel quad-pixel sensor that is 65% larger than the one on the iPhone 13 Pro. It defaults to 12 megapixels, achieved through a process called pixel binning. However, users can access the full capabilities of the sensor by activating the ProRAW feature. The ultra-wide camera features a new larger 12-megapixel sensor that has 100% focus pixels. The lens has also been improved for optical clarity and features a larger aperture.

The new camera system also incorporates a new "Photonic Engine" for improved image and video quality. Additionally, the video feature now includes Action Mode, which offers video stabilization that can be accessed through the top right corner of the screen. The resolution of the picture can now be customized. The TrueDepth camera has gained autofocus and a larger aperture. It is also capable of focusing on multiple subjects simultaneously.

==== Display ====
The iPhone 14 Pro and Pro Max feature a Super Retina XDR OLED display with a typical maximum brightness of 1,000 nits. However, it can go all the way up to 1,600 nits while watching HDR videos, and 2,000 nits outdoors. The display has a refresh rate of 120 Hz and uses LTPO technology. The iPhone 14 Pro has a resolution of 2556×1179 pixels at 460 pixels per inch (ppi), while the Pro Max variant has a resolution of 2796×1290 pixels at 460 ppi. Both variants have an "always-on display" feature, with an adaptive ProMotion 120 Hz refresh rate that can reduce down to 1 Hz to save battery life while in "always-on" mode.

Both models feature a new design for the area that surrounds the front-facing camera, which Apple previously referred to as the "TrueDepth camera array" and many users referred to as the "notch". The new design is called the "Dynamic Island", which is now a pill-shaped cutout slightly detached from the top of the screen. This design was achieved by moving Face ID hardware components and some sensors previously housed in the "notch" behind the display, including the ambient light sensor, flood illuminator and proximity sensor. To make this new hardware blend more seamlessly with the software, software animations are added to make the pill cutout change shape and size according to app and features being used to display certain alerts and notifications.

==== Battery ====
The iPhone 14 Pro has a 3200 mAh battery that provides 23 hours of video playback and 20 hours of streaming video playback. The Pro Max variant has a 4323 mAh battery that provides 29 hours of video playback and 25 hours of streaming video playback.

==== Connectivity ====
In addition to all the connectivity options offered on previous models, the iPhone 14 Pro and Pro Max can now use satellite connectivity to make calls or send texts in an emergency. The feature is marketed as "Emergency SOS via satellite". It uses the spectrum in L and S bands designated for mobile satellite services by ITU Radio Regulations. When an iPhone user makes an Emergency SOS via satellite request, the message is received by an orbiting satellite operated by Globalstar. The satellite then sends the message down to ground stations located across the globe.

As of November 2022, Globalstar operates a constellation of 24 satellites in low Earth orbit, with plans to enhance this in the future via its partnership with Apple.

The service became available to the public on November 15, 2022. On the same day, Apple announced that it will be extended to France, Germany, Ireland, and the UK in December 2022.

On September 12, 2023, during a launch event, Apple announced Roadside Assistance via satellite, the next feature to make use of the satellite connection capabilities of the iPhone 15 series that was just revealed, as well as the iPhone 14 series. Through a collaboration with AAA, it allows users to request car assistance dispatch in areas without cell service.

=== Software ===
Like the iPhone 14 and 14 Plus, the iPhone 14 Pro and Pro Max were shipped with iOS 16. They also support iOS 17, iOS 18, iOS 26, and iOS 27, with the exception of any Apple Intelligence features added with these updates. The next-generation Qi2 wireless charging standard has been added to the iPhone 14 series of devices with the update to iOS 17.2.

=== Detailed specs ===
Model		iPhone 14 Pro Max	iPhone 14 Pro
Picture			
Initial release operating system		iOS 16.0	
Latest release operating system		iOS 27.2	
Display	Screen Size	6.69 in (170 mm) (diagonal); 6.07 by 2.8 in (154 by 71 mm)	6.12 in (155 mm) (diagonal); 5.56 by 2.56 in (141 by 65 mm)
Display	Backlight	—N/a	
Display	Multi-touch	Yes	
Display	Technology	Super Retina XDR Display all-screen OLED	
Display	Resolution	2796 × 1290	2556 × 1179
Display	Pixel density (ppi)	460	
Display	Aspect ratio	~19.5:9	
Display	Typical max brightness ( cd/m^{2})	1,000	
Display	HDR Max brightness ( cd/m^{2})	1,600	
Display	Outdoor max brightness ( cd/m^{2})	2,000	
Display	Contrast ratio (typical)	2,000,000:1	
Display	Fingerprint-resistant oleophobic coating	Yes	
Display	Full sRGB Display	Yes	
Display	Wide color display (Display P3)	Yes	
Display	True Tone display	Yes	
Display	Night Shift	Yes	
Display	ProMotion Display	Yes	
Display	Always-on display	Yes	
Display	HDR Display	Yes	
Display	HDR 10 Content	Yes	
Display	Dolby Vision	With HDR	
Display	Dynamic Island	Yes	
Display	Taptic	Haptic Touch	
Processor	Chip	Apple A16 Bionic	
Processor	Technology node	4 nm (N4)	
Processor	Total cores	6	
Processor	High-performance cores	2 × Everest	
Processor	Energy-Efficiency Cores	4 × Sawtooth	
Processor	Clock speed	3.46 GHz	
Processor	Bit	64-bit	
Processor	Motion coprocessor	Embedded in SoC	
Processor	Bus width	64-bit	
Processor	Graphics processor	Sixth generation Apple designed 5-core GPU	
Processor	Neural Engine	Sixth generation Apple designed 16-core Neural Engine (17 TOPS)	
Storage		128 GB, 256 GB, 512 GB or 1 TB	
Storage Type		3D NAND Flash driven by NVMe-based controller that communicates over a PCIe connection Manufactured by Yangtze Memory Technologies Corp	
RAM		6 GB	
RAM Type		LPDDR5 3200 MHz (51.2 GB/s)	
Connector		8-pin Lightning connector	
Connectivity	Wi-Fi (802.11)	Wi-Fi 6 (802.11a/b/g/n/ac/ax)	
Connectivity	MIMO	Yes	
Connectivity	NFC	With reader mode in background	
Connectivity	Express cards	With power reserve	
Connectivity	Bluetooth	Bluetooth 5.3	
Connectivity	Ultra-wideband chip for spatial awareness	Yes	
Connectivity	Cellular	GSM/EDGE/UMTS/HSPA+/DC-HSDPA/CDMA EV-DO Rev. A (some models)/Gigabit-class LTE/5G (sub-6 GHz and mmWave (some models))	
Connectivity	VoLTE	Yes	
Connectivity	Assisted GPS	Precision Dual-frequency	
Connectivity	GLONASS/GNSS	Precision Dual-frequency	
Connectivity	BeiDou	Precision Dual-frequency	
Connectivity	SIM form-factor	United States: eSIM only, supports dual eSIM; Mainland China, Hong Kong and Macau: Dual Nano-SIM cards; Other regions: One Nano-SIM card and one eSIM, supports dual eSIM; STMicroelectronics ST33J Secure eSIM Microcontroller	
Secure authentication	Touch ID	No	
Secure authentication	Face ID	Yes	
Safety	Emergency SOS	Via Satellite (Certain countries only)	
Safety	Crash Detection	Yes	
Sensors	LiDAR sensor	Yes	
Sensors	Proximity sensor	Yes	
Sensors	Three-axis gyro	High dynamic range gyro	
Sensors	Accelerometer	High-g accelerometer	
Sensors	Ambient light sensor	Yes	
Sensors	Barometer	Yes	
Rear camera	Camera	48 MP Main; 12 MP Ultra Wide; 12 MP 2× Telephoto (enabled by quad-pixel main camera); 12 MP 3× Telephoto	
Rear camera	Aperture	f/1.78 (Main and 2× Telephoto) f/2.2 (Ultra Wide) f/2.8 (3× Telephoto)	
Rear camera	Pixel size for main camera	1.22 μm (48 MP); 2.44 μm (quad-pixel 12 MP)	
Rear camera	Sensor size for Main camera	1/1.28"	
Rear camera	Optical Image Stabilization	Main, 2x Telephoto and 3x Telephoto; Second generation sensor-shift optical image stabilization for main and 2× telephoto camera	
Rear camera	Auto image stabilization	Yes	
Rear camera	Element Lens	Seven-element lens (Main and 2× Telephoto) Six-element lens (Ultra Wide and 3x Telephoto)	
Rear camera	Night Mode	Ultra Wide, Main, 2× Telephoto, 3× Telephoto and Night Mode Portrait	
Rear camera	Deep Fusion	Ultra Wide, Main, 2× Telephoto and 3× Telephoto	
Rear camera	Photonic Engine	Yes	
Rear camera	Apple ProRAW	Yes	
Rear camera	Macro mode	Yes	
Rear camera	Photographic Styles	Yes	
Rear camera	Optical Zoom	0.5×, 1×, 2×, 3×	
Rear camera	Digital Zoom	Up to 15x	
Rear camera	Autofocus	100% Focus Pixels (Ultra Wide, Main and 2× Telephoto); With Focus Pixels (Telephoto)	
Rear camera	Panorama	Up to 63 MP	
Rear camera	Portrait Mode	With advanced bokeh and Depth Control	
Rear camera	Portrait Lighting	With six effects (Natural, Studio, Contour, Stage, Stage Mono, High‑Key Mono)	
Rear camera	Lens Cover	Sapphire crystal lens cover	
Rear camera	Burst Mode	Yes	
Rear camera	Flashed	Adaptive True Tone flash	
Rear camera	Live Photos	Yes	
Rear camera	Wide Color Capture	Yes	
Rear camera	HDR for photos	Smart HDR 4	
Rear camera	Video recording	4K at 24 fps, 25 fps, 30 fps or 60 fps 1080p HD at 25 fps, 30 fps or 60 fps	
Rear camera	Cinematic video recording with shallow depth of field	4K at 25 fps or 30 fps	
Rear camera	Extended Dynamic Range Video	60 fps	
Rear camera	Dolby Vision HDR Video	60 fps	
Rear camera	ProRes Video	1080p at 30 fps for 128 GB storage 4K at 30 fps for 256 GB storage and above	
Rear camera	Optical Image Stabilization for Video	Main, 2x Telephoto and 3x Telephoto; Second generation sensor-shift optical image stabilization for main and 2x telephoto camera	
Rear camera	Action Mode	Yes	
Rear camera	Optical Video Zoom	0.5×, 1×, 2×, 3×	
Rear camera	Digital Video Zoom	Up to 9×	
Rear camera	Slow-motion video	1080p at 120 fps or 240 fps	
Rear camera	Audio Zoom	Yes	
Rear camera	QuickTake Video	Yes	
Rear camera	Time-lapse video with stabilization	Yes	
Rear camera	Cinematic video stabilization	4K, 1080p and 720p	
Rear camera	Stereo Recording	Yes	
Front camera	Camera	12 MP TrueDepth	
Front camera	Aperture	f/1.9	
Front camera	Autofocus	Yes	
Front camera	Portrait mode	With advanced bokeh and Depth Control	
Front camera	Portrait lighting	With six effects (Natural, Studio, Contour, Stage, Stage Mono, High‑Key Mono)	
Front camera	Night mode	Yes	
Front camera	Deep Fusion	Yes	
Front camera	Photonic Engine	Yes	
Front camera	Photographic Styles	Yes	
Front camera	Animoji and Memoji	Yes	
Front camera	Live Photos	Yes	
Front camera	Wide color capture	Yes	
Front camera	Retina Flash	Yes	
Front camera	Video Recording	4K at 24 fps, 25 fps, 30 fps or 60 fps 1080p HD at 25 fps, 30 fps or 60 fps	
Front camera	Slow-motion video	1080p at 120 fps	
Front camera	Extended Dynamic Range Video	30 fps	
Front camera	Dolby Vision HDR Video	4K at 60 fps	
Front camera	ProRes video	1080p at 30 fps for 128 GB storage 4K at 30 fps for 256 GB storage and above	
Front camera	HDR for photos	Smart HDR 4	
Front camera	Cinematic video stabilization	4K, 1080p and 720p	
Front camera	Auto image stabilization	Yes	
Front camera	FaceTime	Yes	
Audio	Playback	Spatial Audio	
Audio	Amplifier	Cirrus Logic CS35L27 Audio Amplifier	
Audio	Dolby Atmos	Built-in speakers and headphones with Spatial Audio	
Audio	3.5 mm Jack	No	
HAC Rating		M3, T4	
Compatible with Made for iPhone Hearing aids		Yes	
Live Listen		Yes	
Materials	Front	Glass	
Materials	Back	Textured matte glass	
Materials	Side	Stainless steel	
Colors			
Power		3.86 V 16.68 W·h (4,323 mA·h)	3.87 V 12.38 W·h (3,200 mA·h)
Fast charging		20 W, up to 50% charge in 30 minutes (20 W adapter sold separately)	
Wireless charging		MagSafe and Qi wireless charging	
Resistant		IP68 (Maximum depth of 6 meters up to 30 minutes)	
Dimensions	Height	160.7 mm (6.33 in)	147.5 mm (5.81 in)
Dimensions	Width	77.6 mm (3.06 in)	71.5 mm (2.81 in)
Dimensions	Depth	7.85 mm (0.309 in)	
Weight		240 g (8.5 oz)	206 g (7.3 oz)
Total greenhouse gas emissions		73 kg CO_{2}e	65 kg CO_{2}e
Hardware strings		iPhone15,3	iPhone15,2
Model number		A2651 · A2893 · A2894 · A2895 · A2896	A2650 · A2889 · A2890 · A2891 · A2892
Announced date		September 7, 2022	
Released date		September 16, 2022	
Discontinued date		September 12, 2023	
Unsupported date		Supported	

== Reception ==
The iPhone 14 Pro received generally positive reviews. Patrick Holland from CNET gave a generally positive review of the phone, highlighting the camera improvements as well as the functionality of the Dynamic Island, though wishing that more functionality for the feature was added. Holland additionally noted a bug on the new Apple Weather app that was later fixed, and how the battery was not improved from the previous year's Pro iPhones, though still deemed it Apple's best offer in iPhone technology of the year.

Holland's opinion was echoed by Tom's Guide writer Jordan Palmer, praising the cameras especially, though noting poorer battery performance and the inconvenience of having no physical SIM card. Palmer still deemed the iPhone 14 Pro the best phone under $1,000. The lack of a SIM card slot was a concern similarly shared by IGN reviewer Kevin Lee, though Lee, like Palmer and Holland, praised the new technology as well as the lack of a price increase compared with the iPhone 13 Pro.

Preceded by iPhone 13 Pro / 13 Pro Max	iPhone; 16th generation alongside iPhone 14 / 14 Plus	Succeeded by iPhone 15 Pro / 15 Pro Max
