= IPhone 14 =

2022 smartphone by Apple

iPhone 14 iPhone 14 Plus

- iPhone 14 in Blue
- Developer: Apple
- Type: Smartphone
- Series: iPhone
- First released: 14: September 16, 2022; 4 years ago 14 Plus: October 7, 2022; 4 years ago
- Discontinued: February 19, 2025; 21 months ago
- Predecessor: iPhone 13 and 13 Mini
- Successor: iPhone 15 and 15 Plus
- Related: iPhone 14 Pro and Pro Max
- Compatible networks: 3G / 4G LTE / 5G NR
- Form factor: Slate
- Colors: Blue, Midnight, Product Red, Starlight, Purple, Yellow
- Dimensions: 14: 146.7 × 71.5 × 7.8 mm (5.78 × 2.81 × 0.31 in); 14 Plus: 160.8 × 78.1 × 7.8 mm (6.33 × 3.07 × 0.31 in)
- Weight: 14: 172 g (6.1 oz); 14 Plus: 203 g (7.2 oz)
- Operating system: Original: iOS 16; Current: iOS 27.2.1, released November 9, 2026
- System-on-chip: Apple A15
- Modem: Qualcomm Snapdragon X65 5G
- Memory: 6 GB LPDDR4X
- Storage: 128, 256 or 512 GB NVMe
- SIM: Dual eSIM (US); Dual nano-SIM (Hong Kong, Macau and mainland China); nano-SIM and eSIM (elsewhere)
- Battery: 14: 12.68 Wh (3279 mAh) Li-ion; 14 Plus: 16.68 Wh (4325 mAh)
- Charging: MagSafe (up to 15W) and Qi (7.5W) wireless charging; Wired charging via Lightning (fast-charge capable)
- Rear camera: 12 MP, f/1.5, 26mm (wide); 12 MP, f/2.4, 13mm (ultrawide); 4K@24/25/30/60fps, 1080p@25/30/60/120/240fps, HDR, Dolby Vision HDR (up to 60fps), Cinematic mode (4K@30fps), stereo sound rec.
- Front camera: 12 MP, f/1.9, 23mm (wide); SL 3D, (depth/biometrics sensor); 4K@24/25/30/60fps, 1080p@25/30/60/120fps, gyro-EIS
- Display: 14: 6.1 in (155 mm) 2532 × 1170 resolution, 19.5:9 aspect ratio (~460 ppi density) Super Retina XDR OLED, HDR10, 800 nits (typ), 1200 nits (peak) supplied by Samsung Display, LG Display, and BOE; 14 Plus: 6.7 in (170 mm) 2778 × 1284 pixels, 19.5:9 ratio (~458 ppi density Super Retina XDR OLED, HDR10, Dolby Vision, 800 nits (HBM), 1200 nits (peak) supplied by Samsung Display
- Sound: Stereo speakers, Spatial Audio, Dolby Atmos
- Connectivity: Wi-Fi 6 (802.11ax (a/b/g/n/ac)) dual-band, Bluetooth 5.3 (A2DP, LE), Ultra-wideband (UWB); GPS, GLONASS, Galileo, QZSS, BeiDou
- Data inputs: List of inputs: Multi-touch screen; 3 microphones; Motion coprocessor; 3-axis gyroscope; 3-axis accelerometer; iBeacon; Barometer; Digital compass; Proximity sensor; Ambient light sensor; Face ID
- Water resistance: IP68 dust/water resistant (up to 6m for 30 minutes)
- Hearing aid compatibility: M3, T4
- Other: FaceTime Audio or Video at 1080p over Wi-Fi and 5G, Voice over LTE
- Website: iPhone 14 at the Wayback Machine (archived September 7, 2022)

The iPhone 14 and iPhone 14 Plus are smartphones that were developed and marketed by Apple. They are the sixteenth-generation iPhones, succeeding the iPhone 13 and iPhone 13 Mini, and were announced during an Apple Event at Apple Park in Cupertino, California, on September 7, 2022, alongside the higher-priced iPhone 14 Pro and iPhone 14 Pro Max. The iPhone 14 and iPhone 14 Plus feature a 6.1-inch (15 cm) and 6.7-inch (17 cm) display, improvements to the rear-facing camera, and satellite connectivity for contacting emergency services.

The iPhone 14 was made available on September 16, 2022, and the iPhone 14 Plus was made available on October 7, 2022. The phones were priced at $799 and $899 respectively and both launched with iOS 16. Pre-orders for the iPhone 14 and iPhone 14 Plus began on September 9, 2022. Along with the iPhone 14 Pro and 14 Pro Max, the iPhone 14 and 14 Plus are the last iPhones to simultaneously feature both the Lightning port and the Ring/Silent switch, as their successors, the iPhone 15 and 15 Plus (announced on September 12, 2023), retain the Ring/Silent switch but use the universal USB-C connector, per European Commission regulation.

The iPhone 14 does not have a "mini" version unlike its predecessor. Instead, Apple returned to a larger model with the iPhone 14 Plus. Apple had not introduced a "Plus" model iPhone since the iPhone 8 Plus in 2017. All iPhone 14 units sold in the United States ended support for physical SIM cards, making them the first iPhone models since the CDMA variant of the iPhone 4 not to come with a discrete SIM card reader, requiring activation by way of eSIM.

The iPhone 14 and 14 Plus are the last standard iPhones to feature the notch, as the iPhone 15 series and later feature the Dynamic Island (except the iPhone 16e and iPhone 17e, which continued to feature the notch for cost-saving measures). The iPhone 14 and 14 Plus are also the last iPhones to feature a 12 MP wide-angle camera sensor and a tempered glass back, as the iPhone 15 and 15 Plus feature a 48MP wide-angle sensor and a matte glass back, but still utilize a 12MP sensor for the ultrawide lens.

The iPhone 14 and 14 Plus were discontinued and removed from Apple's website on February 19, 2025, following the release of the iPhone 16e.

== Overview ==
The iPhone 14 and iPhone 14 Plus was announced alongside the higher-priced, iPhone 14 Pro and 14 Pro Max at Apple's "Far Out" event on September 7, 2022. The 6.7-inch variant of the iPhone 14 was originally rumored to be named as "iPhone 14 Max", as seen in Apple documentation. Apple started taking pre-orders on September 9, with general availability from September 16 for the iPhone 14 and October 7 for the iPhone 14 Plus. In a break with the iPhone Mini product line that had existed for the previous two generations, Apple did not unveil an iPhone 14 Mini. Its role in the product lineup was replaced by the new iPhone 14 Plus due to poor sales of the previous two generations.

The iPhone 14 and iPhone 14 Plus was the first not to have physical SIM card slots, making them the first iPhone models since the CDMA variant of the iPhone 4 not to come with a discrete SIM card reader, requiring activation by way of eSIM.

== Design ==
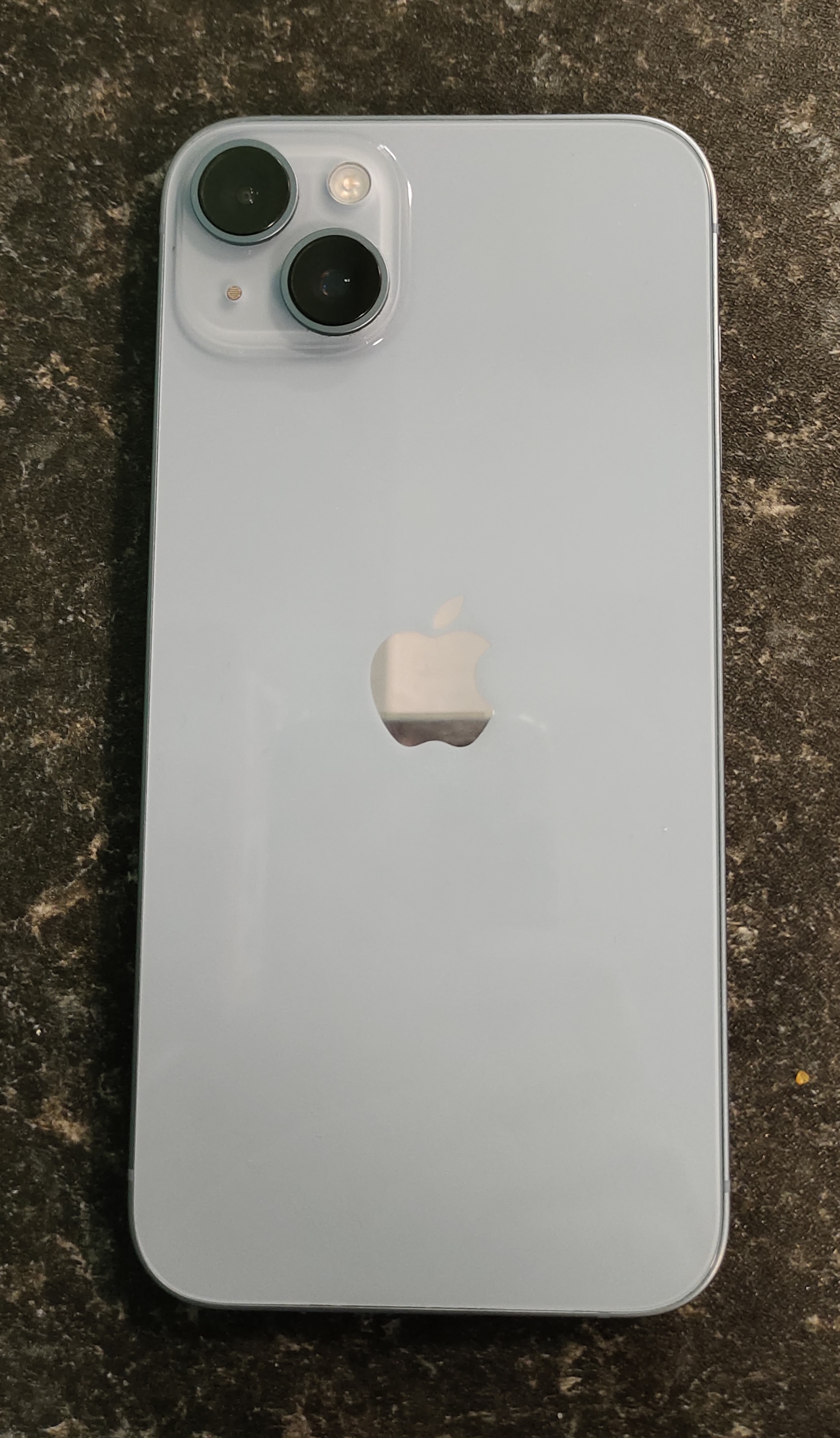
Back of a Blue iPhone 14 Plus

The iPhone 14 and iPhone 14 Plus have an identical design to the iPhone 13, although the US models do not have a physical SIM tray.

The iPhone 14 and iPhone 14 Plus are available in six colors: Blue, Purple, Midnight, Starlight, Yellow, and Product Red. Purple is a new color replacing Pink used on the iPhone 13 and iPhone 13 Mini. The yellow color option was added on March 7, 2023.

The iPhone 14 and iPhone 14 Plus along with the iPhone SE (3rd generation) are the final iPhone models to feature the Product Red color option.

Color	Name
	Blue
	Purple
	Midnight
	Starlight
	Yellow
	PRODUCT(RED)

== Hardware ==
The iPhone 14 and 14 Plus are available in three internal storage configurations: 128, 256, and 512 GB. Both models have 6 GB of RAM, an increase over the previous iPhone 13 and 13 mini models' 4 GB of RAM. The iPhone 14 and 14 Plus have the same IP68 rating for dust and water resistance as their predecessors.

=== Chipset ===
The iPhone 14 and 14 Plus use a 5-nanometer Apple-designed SOC, the A15 Bionic, while the iPhone 14 Pro and 14 Pro Max have a newer A16 Bionic.

The iPhone 14's A15 chip has a 6-core CPU, 5-core GPU, and a 16-core Neural Engine. It is identical to the A15 in the previous year's iPhone 13 Pro and 13 Pro Max, which has more memory (6 GB RAM) and an additional GPU core compared to the A15 in the non-Pro iPhone 13 models (4 GB RAM).

The iPhone 14 was the first flagship model since the 2008 iPhone 3G to have a chip that was unchanged from the previous year. The Verge's Mitchell Clark attributed the unchanged chip to an attempt to maintain costs during the ongoing chip shortage and inflation surge. Clark also said the A15 "still outperforms the latest chips from Qualcomm and Google in most benchmarks", though the older chip may lead to the iPhone 14 and 14 Plus receiving fewer updates and losing support earlier than their Pro counterparts, similar to what happened with the iPhone 5c from 2013.

=== Display ===
The iPhone 14 features a 6.1-inch (155 mm) display with Super Retina XDR OLED technology at a resolution of 2532 × 1170 pixels and a pixel density of about 460 PPI with a refresh rate of 60 Hz. The iPhone 14 Plus features a 6.7-inch (170 mm) display with the same technology at a resolution of 2778 × 1284 pixels and a pixel density of around 458 PPI. Both models have typical brightness of up to 800 nits, and a max brightness of up to 1200 nits.

=== Cameras ===
The iPhone 14 and 14 Plus feature the same dual-camera system: one front-facing camera (12MP f/1.9), and two back-facing cameras: a wide (12MP f/1.5) and ultra-wide (12MP f/2.4) camera, with the wide and front-facing cameras having a faster aperture than the iPhone 13. The front-facing camera also has autofocus for the first time.

The cameras use Apple's latest computational photography engine, called Smart HDR 4. Users can also choose from a range of photographic styles during capture, including rich contrast, vibrant, warm, and cool. Apple clarifies this is different from a filter because it works intelligently with the image processing algorithm during capture to apply local adjustments to an image, and the effects will be baked into the photos, unlike filters which can be removed after applying.

The camera app contains Cinematic Mode, which allows users to rack focus between subjects and create (simulate) shallow depth of field using software algorithms. It is supported on wide and front-facing cameras in 4K at 30 fps and 60 fps.

An "Action mode" feature was added to extend the electrical video stabilization. When activated, a smaller crop of the image sensor is read out for video recording. While reducing the field of view, a wider area around it can be used as buffer against shakes. The area read out from the image sensor is moved between frames to counteract hand movements.

=== Battery ===
The iPhone 14 is equipped with slightly longer battery life compared to the iPhone 13. According to Apple, the iPhone 14 (3,279 mAh) can provide up to 20 hours of video playback, 16 hours of streaming video playback, and 80 hours of audio playback. Its predecessor, the iPhone 13 (3,240 mAh), is rated for up to 19 hours of video playback, 15 hours of streaming video playback, and 75 hours of audio playback. The larger iPhone 14 Plus (4,325 mAh) variant provides up to 26 hours of video playback.

The iPhone 14 and 14 Plus as well as the iPhone 14 Pro, Pro Max, and the iPhone 13 and older do not support viewing the Cycle Count, Manufacture Date, and First Use Date in the Battery Health (& Charging) section in Settings, as this is only supported on the iPhone 15 series and later. The Charge Limit feature is also not supported. Optimized Battery Charging is the only feature similar to the charge limit, but it does not limit the charges unlike the native limit, usually charging to 100% normally when it needs to.

== Software ==
The iPhone 14 and 14 Plus originally shipped with iOS 16. The next-generation Qi2 wireless charging standard was added to the iPhone 14 and 14 Plus with the update to iOS 17.2. The latest version of iOS, iOS 27, supports the iPhone 14 and 14 Plus.

== Specifications ==
Model		iPhone 14 Plus	iPhone 14
Picture			
Initial release operating system		iOS 16.0	
Latest release operating system		iOS 27.2.1	
Display	Screen Size	6.68 in (170 mm) (diagonal) 6.06 by 2.8 in (154 by 71 mm)	6.06 in (154 mm) (diagonal) 5.54 by 2.56 in (141 by 65 mm)
Display	Backlight	—N/a	
Display	Multi-touch	Yes	
Display	Technology	Super Retina XDR Display all-screen OLED	
Display	Resolution	2778 x 1284	2532 × 1170
Display	Pixel Density (ppi)	458	460
Display	Aspect Ratio	~19.5:9	
Display	Typical Max brightness ( cd/m^{2})	800	
Display	HDR Max brightness ( cd/m^{2})	1,200	
Display	Outdoor Max brightness ( cd/m^{2})	-	
Display	Contrast ratio (typical)	2,000,000:1	
Display	Fingerprint-resistant oleophobic coating	Yes	
Display	Full sRGB Display	Yes	
Display	Wide Color Display (Display P3)	Yes	
Display	True Tone Display	Yes	
Display	Night Shift	Yes	
Display	ProMotion Display	No	
Display	Always-On Display	No	
Display	HDR Display	Yes	
Display	HDR 10 Content	Yes	
Display	Dolby Vision	With HDR	
Display	Dynamic Island	No	
Display	Taptic	Haptic Touch	
Processor	Chip	Apple A15 Bionic	
Processor	Technology Node	5 nm (N5P)	
Processor	Total Cores	6	
Processor	High-Performance Cores	2 x Avalanche	
Processor	Energy-Efficiency Cores	4 x Blizzard	
Processor	Clock Speed	3.23 GHz	
Processor	Bit	64-bit	
Processor	Motion Coprocessor	Embedded in SoC	
Processor	Bus width	64-bit	
Processor	Graphics Processor	Fifth generation Apple designed 5-core GPU	
Processor	Neural Engine	Fifth generation Apple designed 16-core Neural Engine (15.8 TOPS)	
Storage		128 GB, 256 GB, 512 GB	
Storage Type		NAND Flash driven by NVMe-based controller that communicates over a PCIe connection	
RAM		6 GB	
RAM Type		LPDDR4X 2133 MHz (34.1 GB/s)	
Connector		8-pin Lightning connector	
Connectivity	Wi-Fi (802.11)	Wi-Fi 6 (802.11a/b/g/n/ac/6)	
Connectivity	MIMO	Yes	
Connectivity	NFC	With Reader Mode in background	
Connectivity	Express Cards	With Power Reserve	
Connectivity	Bluetooth	Bluetooth 5.3	
Connectivity	Ultra Wideband chip for spatial awareness	Yes	
Connectivity	Cellular	GSM/EDGE/UMTS/HSPA+/DC-HSDPA/CDMA EV-DO Rev. A (some models)/Gigabit-class LTE/5G (sub-6 GHz and mmWave (some models))	
Connectivity	VoLTE	Yes	
Connectivity	Assisted GPS	Precision Dual-frequency	
Connectivity	GLONASS/GNSS	Precision Dual-frequency	
Connectivity	BeiDou	Precision Dual-frequency	
Connectivity	SIM card form-factor	Dual SIM with one Nano-SIM and one eSIM, supports dual eSIM No physical SIM card form factor in U.S. models	
Connectivity	SIM card form-factor	Dual Nano-SIM in mainland China, Hong Kong and Macau	
Secure Authentication	Touch ID	No	
Secure Authentication	Face ID	Yes	
Safety	Emergency SOS	Via Satellite (U.S., Canada, France, Germany, Ireland, U.K., Australia, Austria, Belgium, Italy, Luxembourg, the Netherlands, New Zealand, and Portugal only)	
Safety	Crash Detection	Yes	
Sensors	LiDAR sensor	No	
Sensors	Proximity sensor	Yes	
Sensors	Three-axis gyro	High dynamic range gyro	
Sensors	Accelerometer	High-g accelerometer	
Sensors	Ambient Light Sensor	Yes	
Sensors	Barometer	Yes	
Rear Camera	Camera	12 MP Main 12 MP Ultra Wide	
Rear Camera	Aperture	f/1.5 (Wide) f/2.4 (Ultra Wide)	
Rear Camera	Pixel Size for Wide camera	1.9 μm (12 MP main)	
Rear Camera	Sensor Size for Main camera	1/1.7"	
Rear Camera	optical image stabilization	Sensor-shift optical image stabilization for main camera	
Rear Camera	Auto Image Stabilization	Yes	
Rear Camera	Element Lens	Seven-element lens (Main) Six-element lens (Ultra Wide)	
Rear Camera	Night Mode	Ultra Wide, Main, and Night Mode Portrait	
Rear Camera	Deep Fusion	Ultra Wide, Main	
Rear Camera	Photonic Engine	Yes	
Rear Camera	Apple ProRAW	No	
Rear Camera	Macro mode	No	
Rear Camera	Photographic Styles	Yes	
Rear Camera	Optical Zoom	0.5x, 1x	
Rear Camera	Digital Zoom	Up to 5x	
Rear Camera	Autofocus	100% Focus Pixels (only Main)	
Rear Camera	Panorama	Up to 63 MP	
Rear Camera	Portrait Mode	With advanced bokeh and Depth Control	
Rear Camera	Portrait Lighting	With six effects (Natural, Studio, Contour, Stage, Stage Mono, High‑Key Mono)	
Rear Camera	Lens Cover	Sapphire crystal lens cover	
Rear Camera	Burst Mode	Yes	
Rear Camera	Flash	Adaptive True Tone flash	
Rear Camera	Live Photos	Yes	
Rear Camera	Wide Color Capture	Yes	
Rear Camera	HDR for photos	Smart HDR 4	
Rear Camera	Video Recording	4K at 24 fps, 25 fps, 30 fps or 60 fps 1080p HD at 25 fps, 30 fps or 60 fps	
Rear Camera	Cinematic video recording with shallow depth of field	4K at 25 fps or 30 fps	
Rear Camera	Extended Dynamic Range Video	60 fps	
Rear Camera	Dolby Vision HDR Video	60 fps	
Rear Camera	ProRes Video	No	
Rear Camera	optical image stabilization for Video	Sensor-shift optical image stabilization for main camera	
Rear Camera	Action Mode	Yes	
Rear Camera	Optical Video Zoom	0.5x, 1x	
Rear Camera	Digital Video Zoom	Up to 3x	
Rear Camera	Slow-motion video	1080p at 120 fps or 240 fps	
Rear Camera	Audio Zoom	Yes	
Rear Camera	QuickTake Video	Yes	
Rear Camera	Time-lapse video with stabilization	Yes	
Rear Camera	Cinematic video stabilization	4K, 1080p and 720p	
Rear Camera	Stereo Recording	Yes	
Front Camera	Camera	12 MP TrueDepth	
Front Camera	Aperture	f/1.9	
Front Camera	Autofocus	Yes	
Front Camera	Portrait Mode	With advanced bokeh and Depth Control	
Front Camera	Portrait Lighting	With six effects (Natural, Studio, Contour, Stage, Stage Mono, High‑Key Mono)	
Front Camera	Night mode	Yes	
Front Camera	Deep Fusion	Yes	
Front Camera	Photonic Engine	Yes	
Front Camera	Photographic Styles	Yes	
Front Camera	Animoji and Memoji	Yes	
Front Camera	Live Photos	Yes	
Front Camera	Wide color capture	Yes	
Front Camera	Retina Flash	Yes	
Front Camera	Video Recording	4K at 24 fps, 25 fps, 30 fps or 60 fps 1080p HD at 25 fps, 30 fps or 60 fps	
Front Camera	Slow-motion video	1080p at 120 fps	
Front Camera	Extended Dynamic Range Video	30 fps	
Front Camera	Dolby Vision HDR Video	4K at 60 fps	
Front Camera	ProRes Video	No	
Front Camera	HDR for photos	Smart HDR 4	
Front Camera	Cinematic video stabilization	4K, 1080p and 720p	
Front Camera	Auto Image Stabilization	Yes	
Front Camera	FaceTime	Yes	
Audio	Playback	Spatial Audio	
Audio	Dolby Atmos	Built-in speakers and headphones with Spatial Audio	
Audio	3.5 mm Jack	No	
HAC Rating		M3, T4	
Compatible with Made for iPhone Hearing Aids		Yes	
Live Listen		Yes	
Materials	Front	All models have black glass front	
Materials	Back	Glass back	
Materials	Side	Aluminum	
Colors			
Power		3.86 V 16.68 W·h (4,323 mA·h)	3.87 V 12.68 W·h (3,279 mA·h)
Fast Charging		20 W, up to 50% charge in 30 minutes (20 W adapter sold separately)	
Wireless Charging		MagSafe and Qi wireless charging	
Resistant		IP68 (Maximum depth of 6 meters up to 30 minutes)	
Dimensions	Height	160.8 mm (6.33 in)	146.7 mm (5.78 in)
Dimensions	Width	78.1 mm (3.07 in)	71.5 mm (2.81 in)
Dimensions	Depth	7.8 mm (0.31 in)	
Weight		203 g (7.2 oz)	172 g (6.1 oz)
Total greenhouse gas emissions		68 kg CO_{2}e	61 kg CO_{2}e
Hardware strings		iPhone14,8	iPhone14,7
Model number		A2886 A2632 A2885 A2896 A2887	A2882 A2649 A2881 A2884 A2883
Announced Date		September 7, 2022	
Released Date		October 7, 2022	September 16, 2022
Discontinued Date		February 19, 2025	
Unsupported Date		Supported	

== Satellite connectivity ==
Apple's new Emergency SOS via satellite service for iPhone 14 and iPhone 14 Pro models uses the spectrum in L and S bands designated for mobile satellite services by ITU Radio Regulations. When an iPhone user makes an Emergency SOS via satellite request, the message is received by an orbiting satellite operated by Globalstar. The satellite then sends the message down to ground stations located across the globe.

As of November 2022, Globalstar operates a constellation of 25 satellites in low Earth orbit, with plans to enhance this in the future via its partnership with Apple.

The service became available to US and Canada on November 15, 2022, and to the UK, Germany, Ireland, and France on December 13, 2022. From May 15, 2023, the service became available in Australia and New Zealand. However, it is not the first mobile phone to combine both cellular and satellite connectivity.

== Criticism ==
=== iPhone 13 similarity ===
The iPhone 14 and 14 Plus were known to be the most disappointing models of the series due to reusing the A15 Bionic chip from the iPhone 13 Pro, so the performance differences were almost no different from the iPhone 13. As a result, it is highly likely that the iPhone 14 and 14 Plus will lose support at the same time as the iPhone 13 Pro and 13 Pro Max, as both models use the exact same configuration. The same is expected to happen with the iPhone 15 and 15 Plus, which may lose support at the same time as the iPhone 14 Pro and 14 Pro Max, as the architecture between those two models are the same.

The iPhone 14 and 14 Plus also retained the notch while the iPhone 14 Pro and Pro Max got the A16 Bionic chip and the Dynamic Island. The presence of the notch made the phones look outdated from its release date. As a result, certain sources claimed that the iPhone 14 should have been named the iPhone 13s, but Apple had already dropped the "S" moniker entirely after the iPhone XS.

Additionally, the lack of a 120 Hz display, though also standard on the iPhone 15 and 16 non-Pro models, was another disappointment from users.

Furthermore, the camera on the iPhone 14 and 14 Plus also retained the older 12 MP wide-angle camera sensor from the iPhone 13, which made it outdated compared to the 48 MP camera sensor on the iPhone 14 Pro and Pro Max, as well as Android competitors like the Samsung Galaxy S22 and Google Pixel 7 released in the same year, which featured 50 MP wide-angle sensors (though they still captured 12 MP images by default). Therefore, Apple fixed their mistake by adding a 48 MP wide-angle camera sensor inherited from the iPhone 14 Pro on the iPhone 15 and 15 Plus.

Unlike the standard iPhone 14, that became the best-selling iPhone model of 2023 later in its lifecycle, the iPhone 14 Plus was the worst-selling model in the lineup, as it was only priced $200 cheaper than the flagship iPhone 14 Pro Max and had the same specs as the regular iPhone 14, leading to people ignoring the Plus model entirely and going with the Pro Max model instead.

This led to people skipping the iPhone 14 and 14 Plus entirely early in its lifecycle, opting for the discounted iPhone 13 or the iPhone 14 Pro instead. However, the standard iPhone 14 became the best-selling iPhone model of 2023 later in its lifecycle. As a result of this, Apple cut production lines for the iPhone 14 and 14 Plus with immediate effect, and allocated them for the iPhone 14 Pro and Pro Max instead. It also made the iPhone 14 and 14 Plus one of the most disappointing releases in Apple’s history, similar to what happened with the iPhone 5c, iPhone 8, iPhone 12 Mini, and iPhone 13 Mini.

=== Crash Detection false positives ===
Crash Detection is a feature built into the iPhone 14 that is designed to detect severe car crashes and automatically initiates an emergency phone call 20 seconds after it is detected unless the user cancels it. Since its release, there have been many reports stating that the feature was automatically turned on during rollercoaster rides, due to the fact that the rides suddenly stop after going at high speeds, as happens in a car crash.

Emergency dispatchers have received many false alarm calls from iPhone 14 and Apple Watch users who have been skiing safely. In Colorado, a wave of false 9-1-1 calls led Aspen Mountain to advise device owners to upgrade their operating systems or disable the feature. In Japan's Hida Mountains, emergency dispatchers reported 134 false emergency calls, more than 14% of the total emergency call volume, between December 16, 2022, and January 23, 2023, attributed to Crash Detection triggering while an iPhone 14 owner was skiing.

=== Repairability ===
While the iPhone 14 was originally lauded for its innovative new hardware design and recommended by iFixit, concerns over software limitations on parts not authorized by Apple caused iFixit to decrease their evaluation to a 4/10 or "not recommended" in September 2023.

== Discontinuation ==
To comply with mandates, the iPhone 14 and 14 Plus along with the iPhone SE (3rd generation) were discontinued in the European Union in December 2024, completing the iPhone's transition from Lightning to USB-C. The iPhone 14, 14 Plus, and iPhone SE (3rd generation) were discontinued and removed from Apple's official website worldwide on February 19, 2025, following the release of the iPhone 16e. They are the sixth non-budget iPhones to be discontinued following the release of a budget model in an earlier month, rather than following the release of a new series in a later month such as September.

== Release dates ==
=== iPhone 14 ===
September 16, 2022

- Australia
- Austria
- Belgium
- Canada
- China
- Croatia
- Czech Republic
- Denmark
- Finland
- France
- Germany
- Hong Kong
- Hungary
- India
- Italy
- Ireland
- Japan
- Luxembourg
- Netherlands
- New Zealand
- Norway
- Poland
- Portugal
- Romania
- Somalia
- Singapore
- Spain
- Sweden
- Switzerland
- Taiwan
- Thailand
- United Arab Emirates
- United Kingdom
- United States

September 22, 2022

- Brazil
- Israel

September 23, 2022

- Bahrain
- Malaysia
- Turkey

October 7, 2022

- South Korea

October 14, 2022

- Philippines
- Vietnam

October 18, 2022

- Bangladesh

October 28, 2022

- Nigeria

November 4, 2022

- Indonesia

February 10, 2023

- Colombia

June 8, 2024

- Egypt

=== iPhone 14 Plus ===
October 7, 2022

- Australia
- Austria
- Brazil
- Canada
- Belgium
- China
- Croatia
- Denmark
- France
- Germany
- Hong Kong
- Hungary
- India
- Ireland
- Italy
- Japan
- Luxembourg
- Malaysia
- Netherlands
- New Zealand
- Norway
- Poland
- Portugal
- Singapore
- South Korea
- Spain
- Sweden
- Switzerland
- Taiwan
- Thailand
- United Arab Emirates
- United Kingdom
- United States
- Chile

October 14, 2022

- Philippines
- Turkey

October 18, 2022

- Bangladesh
- Israel

November 4, 2022

- Indonesia

February 10, 2023

- Colombia

== See also ==
- List of iPhone models
- History of the iPhone
- Timeline of iPhone models

Preceded by iPhone 13 / 13 Mini	iPhone; 16th generation alongside iPhone 14 Pro / 14 Pro Max	Succeeded by iPhone 15 / 15 Plus
