= IPhone 15 =

2023 smartphone by Apple

iPhone 15 iPhone 15 Plus

- iPhone 15 in Blue
- Developer: Apple
- Type: Smartphone
- Series: iPhone
- First released: September 22, 2023; 3 years ago
- Availability by region: September 22, 2023: Australia; Austria; Belgium; Canada; China; Cyprus; Czech Republic; Denmark; Finland; France; Germany; Greece; Hong Kong; Hungary; India; Italy; Ireland; Japan; Luxembourg; Mexico; Netherlands; New Zealand; Norway; Poland; Portugal; Romania; Qatar; Saudi Arabia; Singapore; Slovakia; Spain; Sweden; Switzerland; Taiwan; Thailand; United Arab Emirates; United Kingdom; United States; September 29, 2023: Bahrain; Brazil; Kuwait; Malaysia; Oman; Turkey; Vietnam; October 13, 2023: South Korea; October 20, 2023: Philippines; Nigeria; October 26, 2023: Bangladesh; Chile; Indonesia; Jamaica; South Africa; Peru; November 3, 2023: Colombia; Israel; Laos; Macau; Myanmar; Pakistan; Panama
- Discontinued: September 9, 2025; 14 months ago
- Predecessor: iPhone 14 and 14 Plus
- Successor: iPhone 16 and 16 Plus
- Related: iPhone 15 Pro and Pro Max
- Compatible networks: 2G, 3G, 4G, 4G LTE, 5G NR
- Form factor: Slate
- Colors: Blue; Pink; Yellow; Green; Black
- Dimensions: 15: H: 147.6 mm (5.81 in) W: 71.6 mm (2.82 in) D: 7.8 mm (0.31 in); 15 Plus: H: 160.9 mm (6.33 in) W: 77.8 mm (3.06 in) D: 7.8 mm (0.31 in)
- Weight: 15: 171 g (6.0 oz); 15 Plus: 201 g (7.1 oz)
- Operating system: Original: iOS 17; Current: iOS 27.2.1, released November 9, 2026
- System-on-chip: Apple A16 Bionic
- Modem: Qualcomm Snapdragon X70 5G
- Memory: 6 GB LPDDR5
- Storage: 128 GB, 256 GB or 512 GB NVMe
- SIM: Dual eSIM (US); Dual nano-SIM (Hong Kong, Macau and mainland China); nano-SIM and eSIM (elsewhere)
- Battery: 15: 12.98 Wh (3349 mAh) Li-ion; 15 Plus: 16.95 Wh (4383 mAh) Li-ion
- Charging: MagSafe and Qi2 wireless charging; USB-C; (fast-charge capable: up to 50% charge in 30 minutes with 20W adaptor or higher); (Up to 50% charge in 20 minutes with 40W adaptor or higher)
- Rear camera: 48 MP, f/1.6, 26 mm equiv. (Note: full-frame equivalent) (wide); 12 MP, f/2.4, 13 mm, equiv. (ultrawide)
- Front camera: 12 MP, f/1.9, 23 mm equiv. (wide); SL 3D (depth/biometrics)
- Display: 15: 6.1 in (150 mm) 2556 × 1179 resolution, 19.5:9 aspect ratio (~460 ppi density) Super Retina XDR OLED, 60Hz, HDR10, 1000 nits (typ), 2000 nits (peak) supplied by Samsung Display; 15 Plus: 6.7 in (170 mm) 2796 × 1290 resolution, 19.5:9 aspect ratio, (~460 ppi density) Super Retina XDR OLED, 60Hz, HDR10, 1000 nits (typ), 2000 nits (peak) supplied by Samsung Display
- Connectivity: Bluetooth 5.3 (A2DP, LE), Ultra-wideband (UWB), USB-C (with DisplayPort support), Wi-Fi 6 (802.11a/b/g/n/ac/ax) dual-band, NFC (reader mode, Express Cards); GPS, GLONASS, Galileo, QZSS, BeiDou
- Data inputs: List of inputs: Multi-touch screen; 3 microphones; Motion coprocessor; 3-axis gyroscope; 3-axis accelerometer; iBeacon; Barometer; Digital compass; Proximity sensor; Ambient light sensor; Face ID
- Water resistance: IP68 dust/water resistant (up to 6m for 30 minutes)
- Hearing aid compatibility: M3, T4
- Other: FaceTime Audio or Video at 1080p over Wi-Fi and 5G, Voice over 5G Standalone (if supported by the carrier)
- Website: iPhone 15 at the Wayback Machine (archived August 29, 2024)

The iPhone 15 and iPhone 15 Plus are smartphones developed and marketed by Apple. They are part of the seventeenth generation of iPhones, succeeding the iPhone 14 and iPhone 14 Plus. The devices were announced on September 12, 2023, during the Apple Event at Apple Park in Cupertino, California, alongside the higher-priced flagship iPhone 15 Pro and 15 Pro Max. Pre-orders began on September 15, 2023, and the devices were made available on September 22, 2023.

Like the iPhone 15 Pro and Pro Max, the 15 and 15 Plus are the first iPhones to replace the Lightning port with a USB-C port due to European Union mandates, which Apple has decided to comply to. However, the Ring/Silent switch is still present, and the iPhone 15 and 15 Plus are the final models to feature it, as the iPhone 15 Pro and Pro Max as well as the iPhone 16 and later feature the Action button.

The iPhone 15 and 15 Plus are the last iPhones to feature 6 GB of RAM and the diagonal rear camera layout from the iPhone 13 and iPhone 14, as the iPhone 15 Pro and Pro Max and later feature 8 GB of RAM, and the iPhone 16 and 16 Plus feature a vertical rear camera layout. Due to this, the iPhone 15 and 15 Plus are excluded from getting Apple Intelligence and AI-powered Siri AI, and continue to use the classic Siri interface.

The iPhone 15 and 15 Plus were fully discontinued on September 9, 2025, following the announcement of the iPhone 17 series. The models were likely discontinued earlier than the iPhone 13 and older, which were sold for longer when new models were released, because they don't support Apple Intelligence, unlike the iPhone 15 Pro and Pro Max, as well as the iPhone 16 series and later.

== History ==
In September 2021, the European Commission began considering a proposal to mandate USB-C on all devices in the European Union, including iPhones. Apple analyst Ming-Chi Kuo claimed that Apple would drop its proprietary Lightning connector by 2023. At the time of those claims, Apple was considering switching to USB-C due to the likelihood that the EU proposal would pass. The proposal was passed into law in October 2022, becoming the Radio Equipment Directive. Apple confirmed it would comply with the regulations later that month.

Two weeks prior to the formal introduction of the iPhone 15, it was announced that some of the devices which were made in India would for the first time be sold around the world on the launch day.

== Design ==
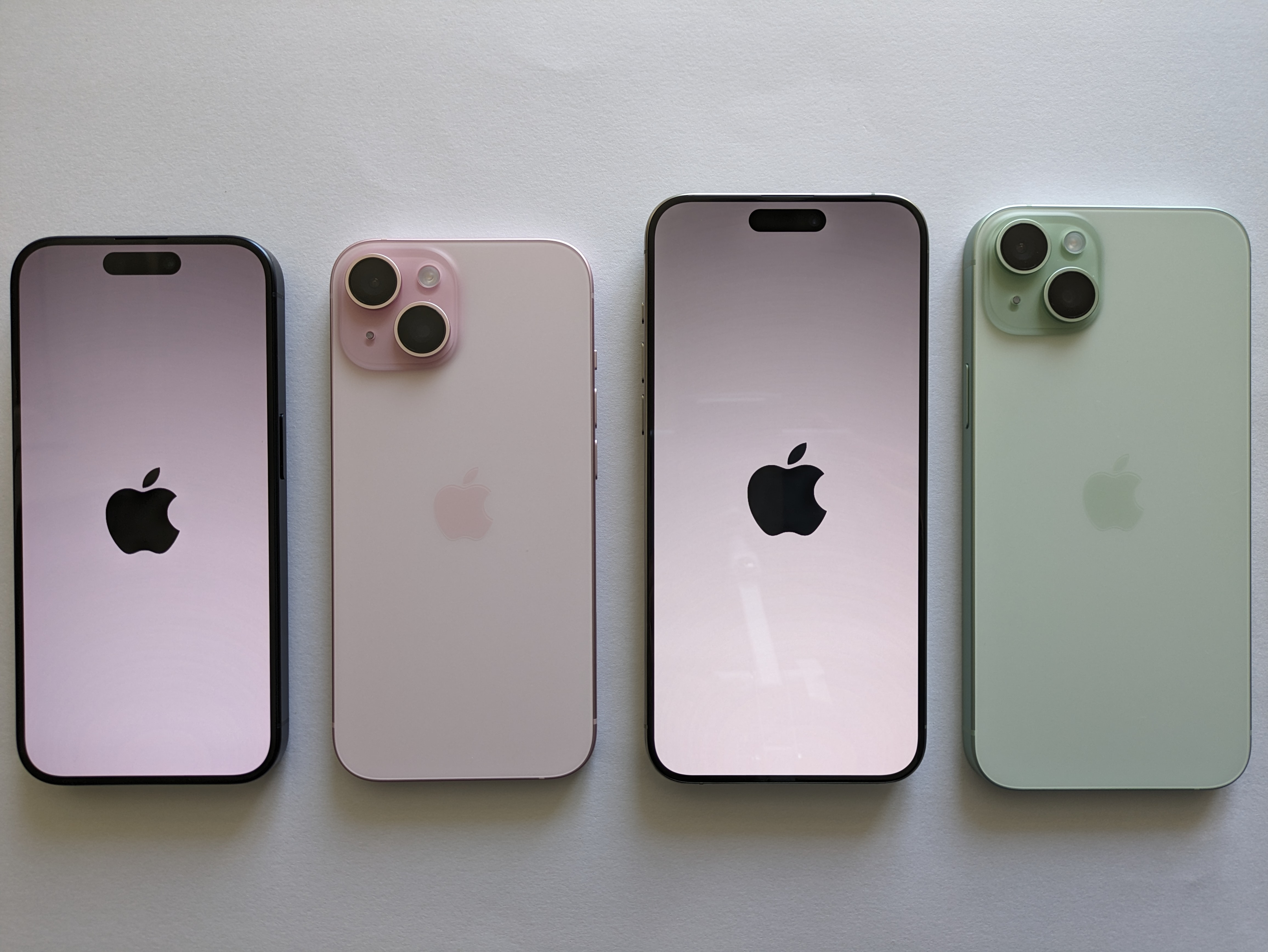
Face and back of iPhone 15 series

The iPhone 15 is the first major redesign since the iPhone 12. The new design features flat sides with soft edges and color-infused matte back glass, replacing the standard tempered glass back used from the iPhone X to iPhone 14. Both iPhone 15 models are available in five colors: blue, pink, yellow, green and black. This makes it the first entry level iPhone since the iPhone XR to not ship with a Product Red variant at launch.

Color	Name
	Blue
	Pink
	Yellow
	Green
	Black

== Hardware ==
=== Display ===
The iPhone 15 features a 6.1-inch (155 mm) display with Super Retina XDR OLED technology at a resolution of 2556×1179 pixels and a pixel density of about 460 PPI with a refresh rate of 60 Hz. The iPhone 15 Plus features a 6.7-inch (170 mm) display with the same technology at a resolution of 2796×1290 pixels and a pixel density of about 460 PPI. Both models have an improved typical brightness of up to 1,000 nits, a peak HDR brightness of up to 1,600 nits, and a peak outdoor brightness of up to 2,000 nits. The Dynamic Island feature, previously exclusive to iPhone 14 Pro, is now standard on iPhone 15, replacing the notch that was introduced in the iPhone X.

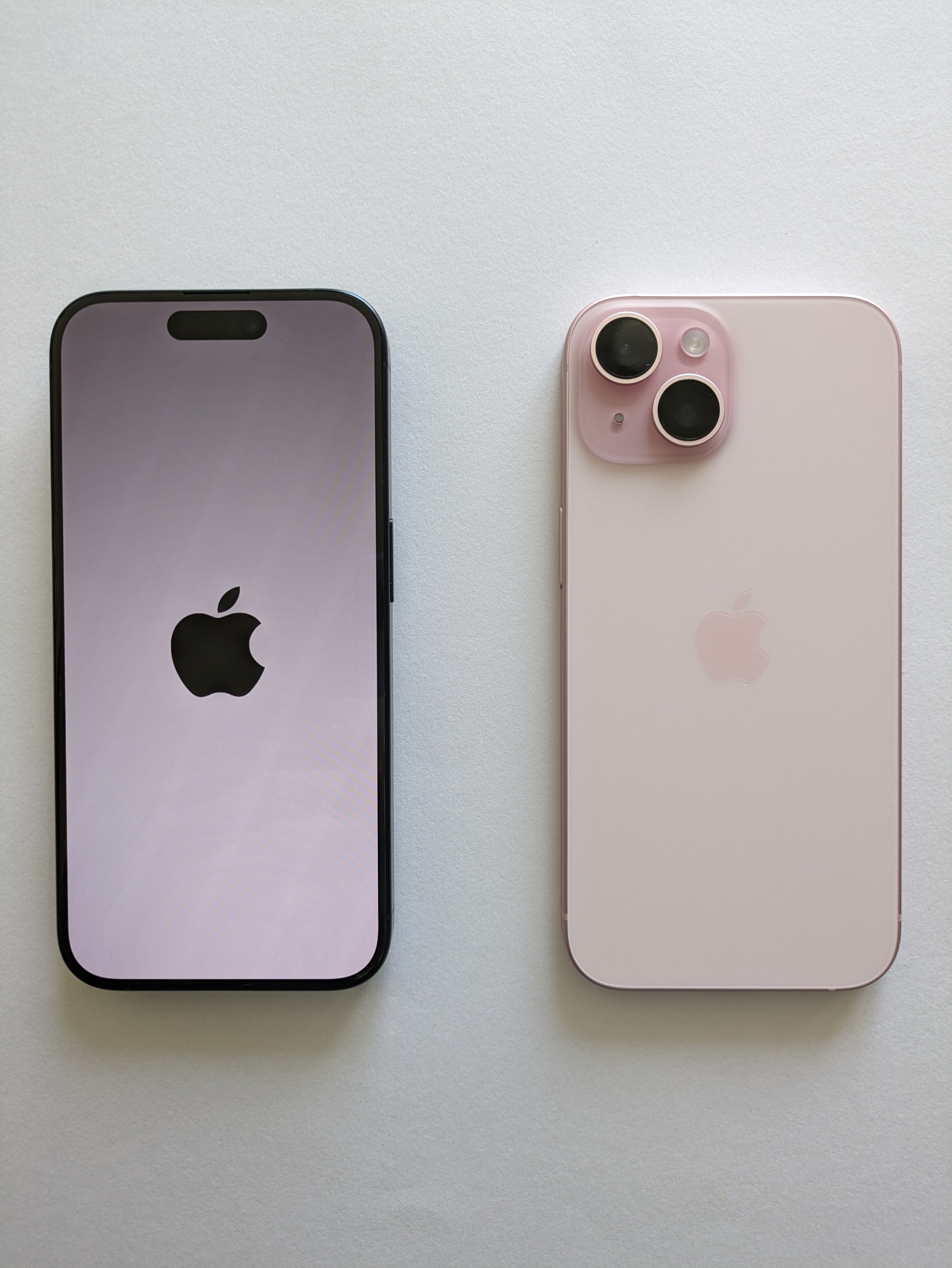
iPhone 15 with 6.1-inch display

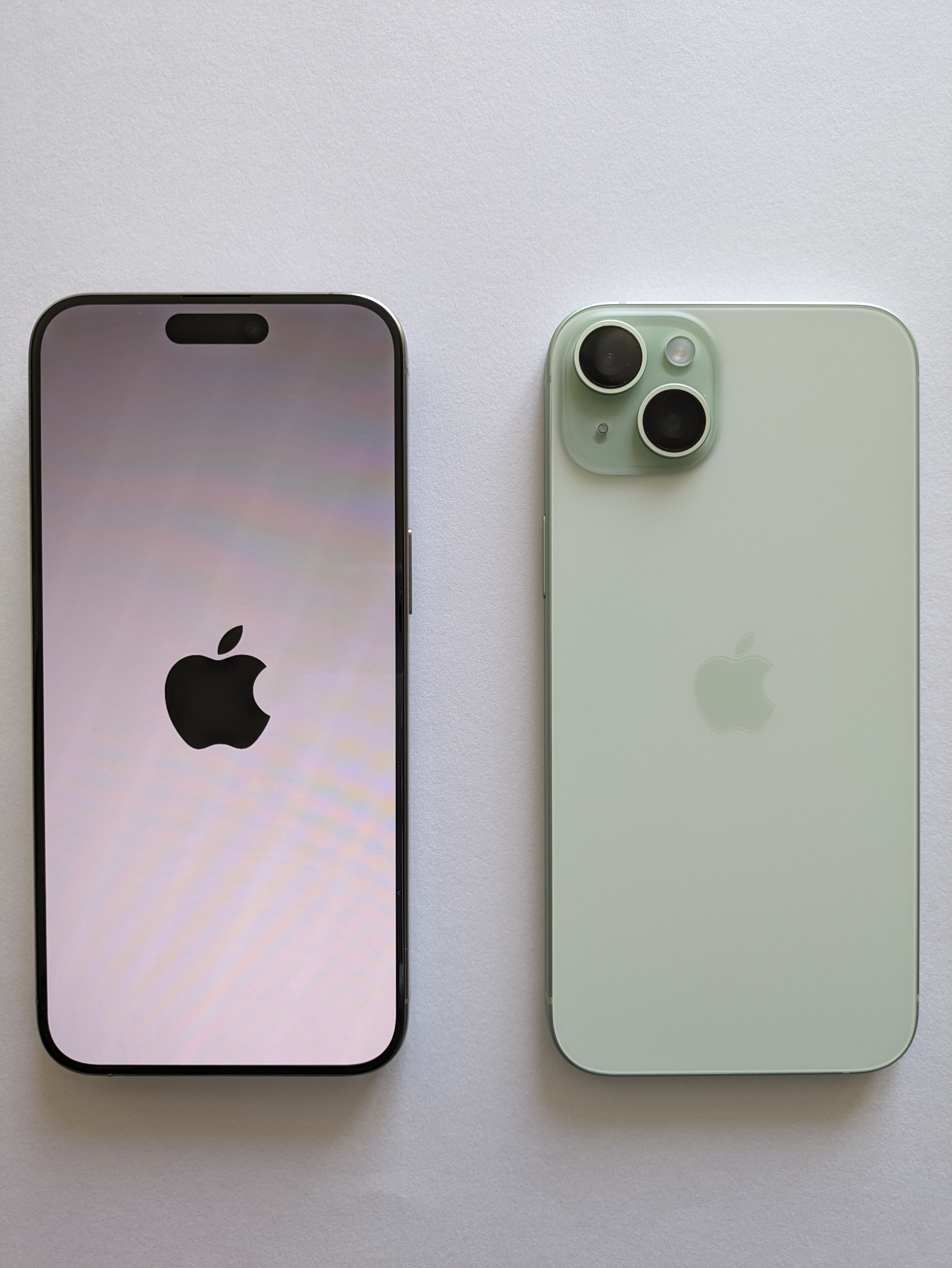
iPhone 15 Plus with 6.7-inch display

=== Absence of Action Button (Ring/Silent switch) ===
Unlike the iPhone 15 Pro and Pro Max, the iPhone 15 and 15 Plus do not have the Action Button as Apple initially kept it exclusive to the Pro and Pro Max models only, so they continue to feature the classic Ring/Silent switch.

Apple never planned to bring haptic buttons to the iPhone 15 and 15 Plus when they were testing Project Bongo, leaving it supposedly only exclusive to the iPhone 15 Pro and Pro Max when it was being tested before the project was canceled entirely and all iPhone 15 models featured physical buttons.

However, with the launch of the iPhone 16 series, all models got the Action Button.

=== Charging and transfer speeds ===
The iPhone 15 and iPhone 15 Plus use USB-C with USB 2.0 transfer speeds (up to 480 Mbit/s or 60 MB/s), compared to the iPhone 15 Pro and iPhone 15 Pro Max which have faster USB 10Gbps transfer speeds (up to 10 Gb/s or 1.25 GB/s). The iPhone 15 and iPhone 15 Plus, as well as the iPhone 15 Pro and iPhone 15 Pro Max, are the first iPhone models to use USB-C, as well as the first iPhones since the iPhone 5 to switch to a new charging port.

=== Video output ===
All iPhone 15 models have support for DisplayPort Alternate Mode over USB-C video output with HDR up to 4K resolution.

Previous iPhone models (from iPhone 5 until iPhone 14) had a maximum supported resolution of 1600 x 900 (slightly less than 1080p FHD) with the Lightning Digital AV Adapter due to technical constraints of the Lightning connector.

=== Battery ===
The iPhone 15 offers users up to 20 hours of video playback and up to 80 hours of audio playback, and the iPhone 15 Plus offers around 25 to 30% more, with up to 26 hours of video playback and up to 100 hours of audio playback. Consumer Reports noted a battery life of 53 hours for the 15 Plus version based on a robotic testing paradigm, placing as the longest battery life out of seventy-three smartphones tested (including newer iPhone models). Starting with iPhone 15, iPhone allows users to limit the battery charge level, in order to help with natural battery aging over time.

== Software ==
The iPhone 15 and iPhone 15 Plus launched with iOS 17 and are compatible with iOS 27.

Apple announced that the iPhone 15 and iPhone 15 Plus would not be compatible with Apple Intelligence, first released in October 2024.

iOS 17 brought many new features, including Contact Posters to personalize specific contacts and satellite Emergency SOS for emergency situations.

Consistent with the UK Product Security and Telecommunications Infrastructure regulation, it will continue to receive major software updates for a minimum of five years to at least 2028.

== Specifications ==
Model		iPhone 15 Plus	iPhone 15
Picture			
Initial release operating system		iOS 17.0	
Display	Screen Size	6.7 in (170 mm) (diagonal) 6.33 by 3.06 in (161 by 78 mm)	6.1 in (150 mm) (diagonal) 5.81 by 2.82 in (148 by 72 mm)
Display	Backlight	—N/a	
Display	Multi-touch	Yes	
Display	Technology	Super Retina XDR Display all-screen OLED	
Display	Resolution	2796 x 1290	2556 x 1179
Display	Pixel Density (ppi)	460	460
Display	Aspect Ratio	~19.5:9	
Display	Typical Max brightness ( cd/m^{2})	1,000	
Display	HDR Max brightness ( cd/m^{2})	1,600	
Display	Outdoor Max brightness ( cd/m^{2})	2,000	
Display	Contrast ratio (typical)	2,000,000:1	
Display	Fingerprint-resistant oleophobic coating	Yes	
Display	Full sRGB Display	Yes	
Display	Wide Color Display (Display P3)	Yes	
Display	True Tone Display	Yes	
Display	Night Shift	Yes	
Display	ProMotion Display	No	
Display	Always-On Display	No	
Display	HDR Display	Yes	
Display	HDR 10 Content	Yes	
Display	Dolby Vision	With HDR	
Display	Dynamic Island	Yes	
Display	Taptic	Haptic Touch	
Processor	Chip	Apple A16 Bionic	
Processor	Technology Node	4 nm (N4P)	
Processor	Total Cores	6	
Processor	High-Performance Cores	2 x Everest	
Processor	Energy-Efficiency Cores	4 x Sawtooth	
Processor	Clock Speed	3.46 GHz	
Processor	Bit	64-bit	
Processor	Motion Coprocessor	Embedded in SoC	
Processor	Bus width	64-bit	
Processor	Graphics Processor	Fifth generation Apple designed 5-core GPU	
Processor	Neural Engine	Fifth generation Apple designed 16-core Neural Engine (15.8 TOPS)	
Storage		128 GB, 256 GB, 512 GB	
Storage Type		NAND Flash driven by NVMe-based controller that communicates over a PCIe connection	
RAM		6 GB	
RAM Type		LPDDR4X 2133 MHz (34.1 GB/s)	
Connector		USB-C (with DisplayPort support)	
Connectivity	Wi-Fi (802.11)	Wi-Fi 6 (802.11a/b/g/n/ac/ax)	
Connectivity	MIMO	Yes	
Connectivity	NFC	With Reader Mode in background	
Connectivity	Express Cards	With Power Reserve	
Connectivity	Bluetooth	Bluetooth 5.3	
Connectivity	Ultra Wideband chip for spatial awareness	Yes	
Connectivity	Cellular	GSM/EDGE/UMTS/HSPA+/DC-HSDPA/Gigabit-class LTE/5G (sub-6 GHz and mmWave (some models))	
Connectivity	VoLTE	Yes	
Connectivity	Assisted GPS	Precision Dual-frequency	
Connectivity	GLONASS/GNSS	Precision Dual-frequency	
Connectivity	BeiDou	Precision Dual-frequency	
Connectivity	SIM card form-factor	Dual SIM with one Nano-SIM and one eSIM, supports dual eSIM No physical SIM card form factor in U.S. models	
Connectivity	SIM card form-factor	Dual Nano-SIM in mainland China, Hong Kong and Macau	
Secure Authentication	Touch ID	No	
Secure Authentication	Face ID	Yes	
Safety	Emergency SOS	Via Satellite (U.S., Canada, France, Germany, Ireland, U.K., Australia, Austria, Belgium, Italy, Luxembourg, the Netherlands, New Zealand, and Portugal only)	
Safety	Crash Detection	Yes	
Sensors	LiDAR sensor	No	
Sensors	Proximity sensor	Yes	
Sensors	Three-axis gyro	High dynamic range gyro	
Sensors	Accelerometer	High-g accelerometer	
Sensors	Ambient Light Sensor	Yes	
Sensors	Barometer	Yes	
Rear Camera	Camera	48 MP Main 12 MP Ultra Wide	
Rear Camera	Aperture	f/1.6 (Wide) f/2.4 (Ultra Wide)	
Rear Camera	Pixel Size for Main camera	1 μm (48 MP) 2 μm (quad pixel 12 MP)	
Rear Camera	Sensor Size for Main camera	1/1.56"	
Rear Camera	Optical Image Stabilization	Sensor-shift optical image stabilization for main camera	
Rear Camera	Auto Image Stabilization	Yes	
Rear Camera	Element Lens	Seven-element lens (Main) Six-element lens (Ultra Wide)	
Rear Camera	Night Mode	Ultra Wide, Main, and Night Mode Portrait	
Rear Camera	Deep Fusion	Ultra Wide, Main	
Rear Camera	Photonic Engine	Yes	
Rear Camera	Apple ProRAW	No	
Rear Camera	Macro mode	No	
Rear Camera	Photographic Styles	Yes	
Rear Camera	Optical Zoom	0.5x, 1x, 2x	
Rear Camera	Digital Zoom	Up to 10x	
Rear Camera	Autofocus	100% Focus Pixels (only Main)	
Rear Camera	Panorama	Up to 63 MP	
Rear Camera	Portrait Mode	With advanced bokeh and Depth Control	
Rear Camera	Portrait Lighting	With six effects (Natural, Studio, Contour, Stage, Stage Mono, High‑Key Mono)	
Rear Camera	Lens Cover	Sapphire crystal lens cover	
Rear Camera	Burst Mode	Yes	
Rear Camera	Flash	Adaptive True Tone flash	
Rear Camera	Live Photos	Yes	
Rear Camera	Wide Color Capture	Yes	
Rear Camera	HDR for photos	Smart HDR 4	
Rear Camera	Video Recording	4K at 24 fps, 25 fps, 30 fps or 60 fps 1080p HD at 25 fps, 30 fps or 60 fps	
Rear Camera	Cinematic video recording with shallow depth of field	4K at 25 fps or 30 fps	
Rear Camera	Extended Dynamic Range Video	60 fps	
Rear Camera	Dolby Vision HDR Video	60 fps	
Rear Camera	ProRes Video	No	
Rear Camera	Optical Image Stabilization for Video	Sensor-shift optical image stabilization for main camera	
Rear Camera	Action Mode	Yes	
Rear Camera	Optical Video Zoom	0.5x, 1x, 2x	
Rear Camera	Digital Video Zoom	Up to 6x	
Rear Camera	Slow-motion video	1080p at 120 fps or 240 fps	
Rear Camera	Audio Zoom	Yes	
Rear Camera	QuickTake Video	Yes	
Rear Camera	Time-lapse video with stabilization	Yes	
Rear Camera	Cinematic video stabilization	4K, 1080p and 720p	
Rear Camera	Stereo Recording	Yes	
Front Camera	Camera	12 MP TrueDepth	
Front Camera	Aperture	f/1.9	
Front Camera	Autofocus	Yes	
Front Camera	Portrait Mode	With advanced bokeh and Depth Control	
Front Camera	Portrait Lighting	With six effects (Natural, Studio, Contour, Stage, Stage Mono, High‑Key Mono)	
Front Camera	Night mode	Yes	
Front Camera	Deep Fusion	Yes	
Front Camera	Photonic Engine	Yes	
Front Camera	Photographic Styles	Yes	
Front Camera	Animoji and Memoji	Yes	
Front Camera	Live Photos	Yes	
Front Camera	Wide color capture	Yes	
Front Camera	Retina Flash	Yes	
Front Camera	Video Recording	4K at 24 fps, 25 fps, 30 fps or 60 fps 1080p HD at 25 fps, 30 fps or 60 fps	
Front Camera	Slow-motion video	1080p at 120 fps	
Front Camera	Extended Dynamic Range Video	30 fps	
Front Camera	Dolby Vision HDR Video	4K at 60 fps	
Front Camera	ProRes Video	No	
Front Camera	HDR for photos	Smart HDR 4	
Front Camera	Cinematic video stabilization	4K, 1080p and 720p	
Front Camera	Auto Image Stabilization	Yes	
Front Camera	FaceTime	Yes	
Audio	Playback	Spatial Audio	
Audio	Dolby Atmos	Built-in speakers and headphones with Spatial Audio	
Audio	3.5 mm Jack	No	
HAC Rating		M3, T4	
Compatible with Made for iPhone Hearing Aids		Yes	
Live Listen		Yes	
Materials	Front	All models have black glass front	
Materials	Back	Glass back	
Materials	Side	Aluminum	
Colors			
Fast Charging		20 W, up to 50% charge in 30 minutes (20 W adapter sold separately)	
Wireless Charging		MagSafe and Qi 2 wireless charging	
Resistant		IP68 (Maximum depth of 6 meters up to 30 minutes)	
Dimensions	Height	160.9 mm (6.33 in)	147.6 mm (5.81 in)
Dimensions	Width	77.8 mm (3.06 in)	71.6 mm (2.82 in)
Dimensions	Depth	7.8 mm (0.31 in)	
Weight		201 g (7.1 oz)	171 g (6.0 oz)
Announced Date		September 12, 2023	
Released Date		September 22, 2023	
Discontinued Date		September 9, 2025	
Unsupported Date		Supported	

== Criticism ==
=== No Apple Intelligence support ===
Users have claimed that they did not receive Apple Intelligence with the iOS 18.1 update, and Apple has confirmed that the iPhone 15 does not support Apple Intelligence due to the older A16 Bionic architecture.

=== Overheating ===
Some owners claimed that their iPhone 15 units were experiencing overheating issues, reportedly reaching temperatures as high as 47 °C (117 °F). Apple later stated that there were several reasons why the phones heat up, mainly hinting at a software issue. It was stated that it would be fixed with an update to iOS 17.0.3. The overheating issues were reported to persist after the update.

== See also ==
- List of iPhone models
- History of the iPhone
- Timeline of iPhone models

Preceded by iPhone 14 / 14 Plus	iPhone; 17th generation alongside iPhone 15 Pro / 15 Pro Max	Succeeded by iPhone 16 / 16 Plus
