= Crash Detection =

Apple Watch and iPhone feature

- Crash Detection on an iPhone and Apple Watch
- Developer: Apple Inc.
- Release: September 16, 2022; 4 years ago
- Operating system: iOS 16 watchOS 9
- Platform: iPhone 14 and later Apple Watch Series 8 and later Apple Watch SE (2nd gen) and later Apple Watch Ultra and later
- License: Proprietary
- Website: support.apple.com/en-gb/HT213225

Crash Detection is an Apple Watch and iPhone feature that automatically places an emergency service call when it detects that the device owner has been in a serious collision.

== Introduction ==
Apple, Inc. introduced Crash Detection on the Apple Watch Series 8, Ultra, and second-generation SE and the iPhone 14 series at an event on September 7, 2022. This came three years later than Google, who had introduced the Car Crash Detection feature on its Pixel 3 smartphone in 2019. The company credits the watch's enhanced gyroscope and accelerometer for making the feature possible, and it also uses data from the watch's barometer, satellite navigation, and microphone features to detect a crash. The feature was inspired by past success with Apple's Fall Detection and atrial fibrillation (AFib) detection in the Apple Watch, two executives told Tech-Crunch, noting that Crash Detection uses multiple inputs to avoid falsely triggering when, for example, an owner accidentally drops their device. In a later interview, Apple head of software Craig Ham said he was "amazed [by] how many letters we got, within days [of Crash Detection's release], from people who had been in car crashes", some of whom said it saved their lives.

== Successful uses ==
In October 2022, a man credited Crash Detection for saving his life by automatically calling emergency services after his tire blew out while he was driving 70 miles per hour (110 km/h) and he crashed into a telephone pole. In a post on Reddit, the crash victim thanked Tim Cook and Apple for having developed the feature. Cook responded hours later, wishing the crash victim well and explaining that the feature was built for incidents like this.

In December 2022, a driver and passenger were saved after their car fell 300 feet (91 m) off the Angeles Crest Highway. Their iPhone 14 automatically detected the crash and called emergency services. The two were not seriously injured and were evacuated by helicopter to Huntington Hospital in Pasadena, California, before being released.

After a crash in Rowella, Tasmania in January 2023, one passenger’s iPhone 14 automatically notified authorities, who were on the scene within 8 minutes. A Ford Ranger pickup truck towing a horse trailer crashed into a tree stump. Five people were injured in the crash and four horses were killed.

In August 2023, 3 suspect teens were found by the Polk County Sheriff’s Office when their car crashed on Lake Hatchineha Road (County Road 542) in Poinciana, Florida. The Polk County deputies and fire rescue crews were responding to a single-vehicle crash from one of the occupants' iPhone.

== False positives ==
Crash Detection has triggered during roller coaster rides because devices have mistaken the rides' sudden stops for car crashes.

In Minnesota in early 2023, emergency responders in multiple counties reported receiving calls triggered by Crash Detection where no emergency existed, including several from snowmobile riders. A reporter noted that although the iPhone makes a noise before calling authorities, that noise might not be audible through winter clothing or over the sound of a snowmobile engine.

Emergency dispatchers have received many false alarm calls from iPhone 14 and Apple Watch users who have been skiing safely. In Colorado, a wave of false 9-1-1 calls led Aspen Mountain to advise device owners to upgrade their operating systems or disable the feature. In Japan's Hida Mountains, emergency dispatchers reported 134 false emergency calls, more than 14% of the total emergency call volume, between December 16, 2022 and January 23, 2023, attributed to Crash Detection triggering while iPhone 14 owners were skiing.

In addressing the occurrence of false positives, iOS underwent six optimizations to Crash Detection, while in contrast, watchOS received only one. The most recent iteration of iOS Crash Detection was introduced in iOS 17.3, while the watchOS counterpart received its latest Crash Detection optimization featured within the framework of watchOS 9.2.
