= IPhone Mini =

iPhone Mini may refer to:

- iPhone 12 Mini, released in 2020
- iPhone 13 Mini, released in 2021
