= IPhone 15 Pro =

2023 smartphone by Apple

iPhone 15 Pro iPhone 15 Pro Max

- iPhone 15 Pro in Natural Titanium
- Developer: Apple
- Type: Smartphone
- First released: September 22, 2023; 3 years ago
- Availability by region: September 22, 2023: Australia; Austria; Belgium; Canada; China; Croatia; Czech Republic; Denmark; Finland; France; Germany; Greece; Hong Kong; Hungary; India; Italy; Ireland; Japan; Luxembourg; Mexico; Netherlands; New Zealand; Norway; Poland; Portugal; Qatar; Romania; Saudi Arabia; Serbia; Singapore; Slovakia; Spain; Sweden; Switzerland; Taiwan; Thailand; United Arab Emirates; United Kingdom; United States; September 29, 2023: Bahrain; Brazil; Kuwait; Malaysia; Oman; Turkey; Vietnam; October 12, 2023: Israel; October 13, 2023: South Korea; October 20, 2023: Philippines; Nigeria; October 26, 2023: Bangladesh; Chile; Indonesia; Jamaica; South Africa; Peru; November 3, 2023: Colombia; Macau; Myanmar; Laos; Pakistan; Panama
- Discontinued: September 9, 2024; 2 years ago
- Predecessor: iPhone 14 Pro and Pro Max
- Successor: iPhone 16 Pro and Pro Max
- Related: iPhone 15 and 15 Plus
- Compatible networks: 2G GSM/EDGE, 3G UMTS/HSPA+, 4G LTE, 5G NR
- Form factor: Slate
- Colors: White titanium; Blue titanium; Natural titanium; Black titanium
- Dimensions: 15 Pro: H: 146.6 mm (5.77 in); W: 70.6 mm (2.78 in); D: 8.25 mm (0.325 in); 15 Pro Max: H: 159.9 mm (6.30 in); W: 76.7 mm (3.02 in); D: 8.25 mm (0.325 in)
- Weight: 15 Pro: 187 g (6.6 oz); 15 Pro Max: 221 g (7.8 oz)
- Operating system: Original: iOS 17; Current: iOS 27.2.1, released November 9, 2026
- System-on-chip: Apple A17 Pro
- Modem: Qualcomm Snapdragon X70 5G
- Memory: 8 GB LPDDR5
- Storage: 128 GB (Pro only); 256 GB; 512 GB; 1 TB; NVMe
- SIM: Dual eSIM (US); Dual nano-SIM (Hong Kong, Macau and mainland China); nano-SIM and eSIM (elsewhere)
- Battery: 15 Pro: 12.70 Wh (3274 mAh) Li-ion @ 3.88 V; 15 Pro Max: 17.32 Wh (4422 mAh) Li-ion @ 3.9 V
- Charging: MagSafe and Qi 2 wireless charging; USB-C; (fast-charge capable: up to 50% charge in 30 minutes with 20W adaptor or higher); (Up to 50% charge in 20 minutes with 40W adaptor or higher)
- Rear camera: 48 MP, f/1.78, 24 mm (wide), 1/1.28", 1.22 μm, dual pixel PDAF, sensor-shift OIS; 12 MP, f/2.2, 13 mm, 120° (ultrawide), 1/2.55", 1.4 μm, dual pixel PDAF; 15 Pro: 12 MP, f/2.8, 77 mm (telephoto), 1 μm, PDAF, OIS, 3× optical zoom, lidar sensor; 15 Pro Max: 12 MP, f/2.8, 120 mm (telephoto), 1.12 μm, PDAF, 3D sensor-shift, OIS, 5× optical zoom, lidar sensor
- Front camera: 12 MP, f/1.9, 23 mm (wide), 1/3.6", PDAF, OIS; SL 3D (depth/biometrics)
- Display: 15 Pro: 6.1 in (155 mm) 2556 × 1179 resolution; 15 Pro Max: 6.7 in (170 mm) 2796 × 1290 resolution; Super Retina XDR OLED, 120 Hz, HDR10, 19.5:9 aspect ratio (~460 ppi density), 1000 nits (typ), 2000 nits (peak) supplied by Samsung Display
- Sound: Dolby Atmos-tuned Spatial Audio
- Connectivity: Wi-Fi 6E (802.11a/b/g/n/ac/ax) tri-band Bluetooth 5.3 (A2DP, LE); Ultra-wideband (UWB); Thread; NFC (reader mode, Express Cards); LEO satellite (Globalstar, limited); USB-C: USB 10Gbps; Dual-frequency GPS (L1, L5), GLONASS, Galileo, QZSS, BeiDou, NavIC
- Data inputs: List of inputs: Multi-touch screen; LiDAR scanner; 3 microphones; Motion coprocessor; 3-axis gyroscope; 3-axis accelerometer; iBeacon; Barometer; Digital compass; Proximity sensor; Ambient light sensor; Face ID
- Water resistance: IP68 dust/water resistant (up to 6 m for 30 mins)
- Hearing aid compatibility: M3, T4
- Made in: China
- Other: FaceTime Audio or Video at 1080p over Wi-Fi and 5G, Voice over 5G Standalone (if supported by the carrier)
- Website: iPhone 15 Pro and iPhone 15 Pro Max at the Wayback Machine (archived September 12, 2023)

The iPhone 15 Pro and iPhone 15 Pro Max are smartphones that were developed and marketed by Apple. They are the seventeenth-generation flagship iPhones, succeeding the iPhone 14 Pro and 14 Pro Max.

The devices were unveiled alongside the lower-priced iPhone 15 and 15 Plus during the Apple Event at Apple Park in Cupertino, California, on September 12, 2023. Pre-orders began on September 15, and the devices were made available to the public on September 22. The iPhone 15 Pro and iPhone 15 Pro Max were discontinued on September 9, 2024, following the announcement of the iPhone 16 Pro and 16 Pro Max.

Similar to the iPhone 15, the 15 Pro replaced the proprietary Lightning connector with USB-C. They also support Apple Intelligence, which was introduced with iOS 18.

== Design ==
The iPhone 15 Pro marks the first significant redesign of the device's outer shell since the iPhone 12 Pro in 2020, with soft contours added to the flat sides. Additionally, the enclosure of the iPhone 15 Pro and 15 Pro Max is made of grade 5 titanium, unlike the stainless steel frame of previous Pro models. The display bezels have also been reduced from 2.2 mm to 1.55 mm. The phone is available in four colors: natural titanium, blue titanium, white titanium, and black titanium. It is also the first premium iPhone since the iPhone X to not come in the gold color option.

Color	Name
	Natural Titanium
	Blue Titanium
	White Titanium
	Black Titanium

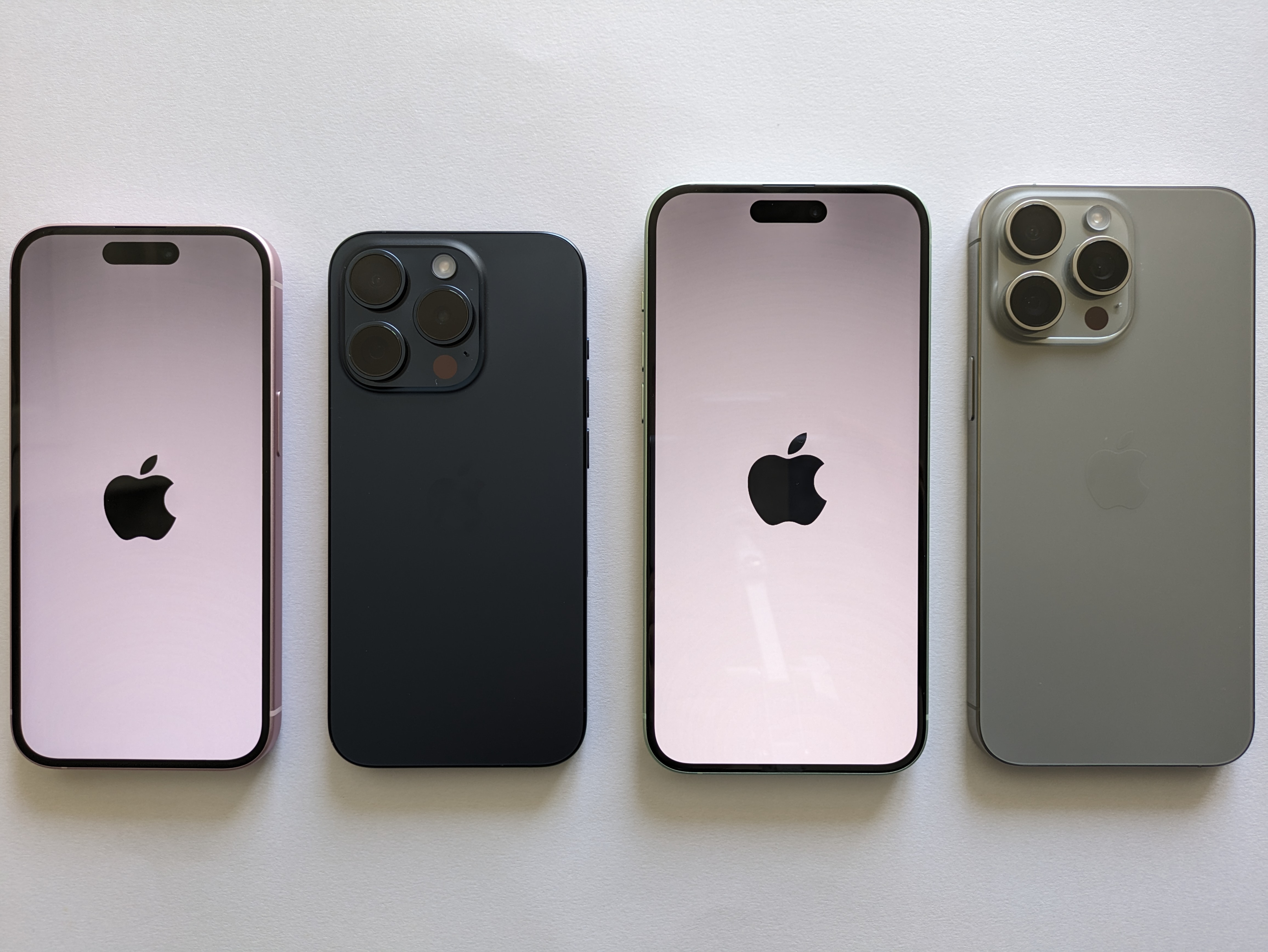
Fronts and backs of the iPhone 15 Pro series

== Specifications ==
=== Hardware ===
Like the iPhone 15 and 15 Plus, the iPhone 15 Pro and 15 Pro Max replace the proprietary Lightning connector with USB-C to comply with the European Union mandating the use of this connector in smartphones with Directive (EU) 2022/2380 in 2022. Apple had already started to introduce USB-C to its handheld devices beginning with the third generation iPad Pro, released in 2018.

The iPhone 15 Pro and 15 Pro Max are the last Pro-level iPhones to feature 6.1-inch and 6.7-inch display sizes, as the iPhone 16 Pro and 16 Pro Max slightly increased the display sizes to 6.3-inch and 6.9-inch.

The iPhone 15 Pro and 15 Pro Max support AV1 video hardware decoding.

In iOS 18, the iPhone 15 Pro and 15 Pro Max are the first iPhones to be capable of supporting the new Apple Intelligence AI features, due to the increased amount of DRAM in these models and their fast 35 trillion-operation-per-second Neural Engine.

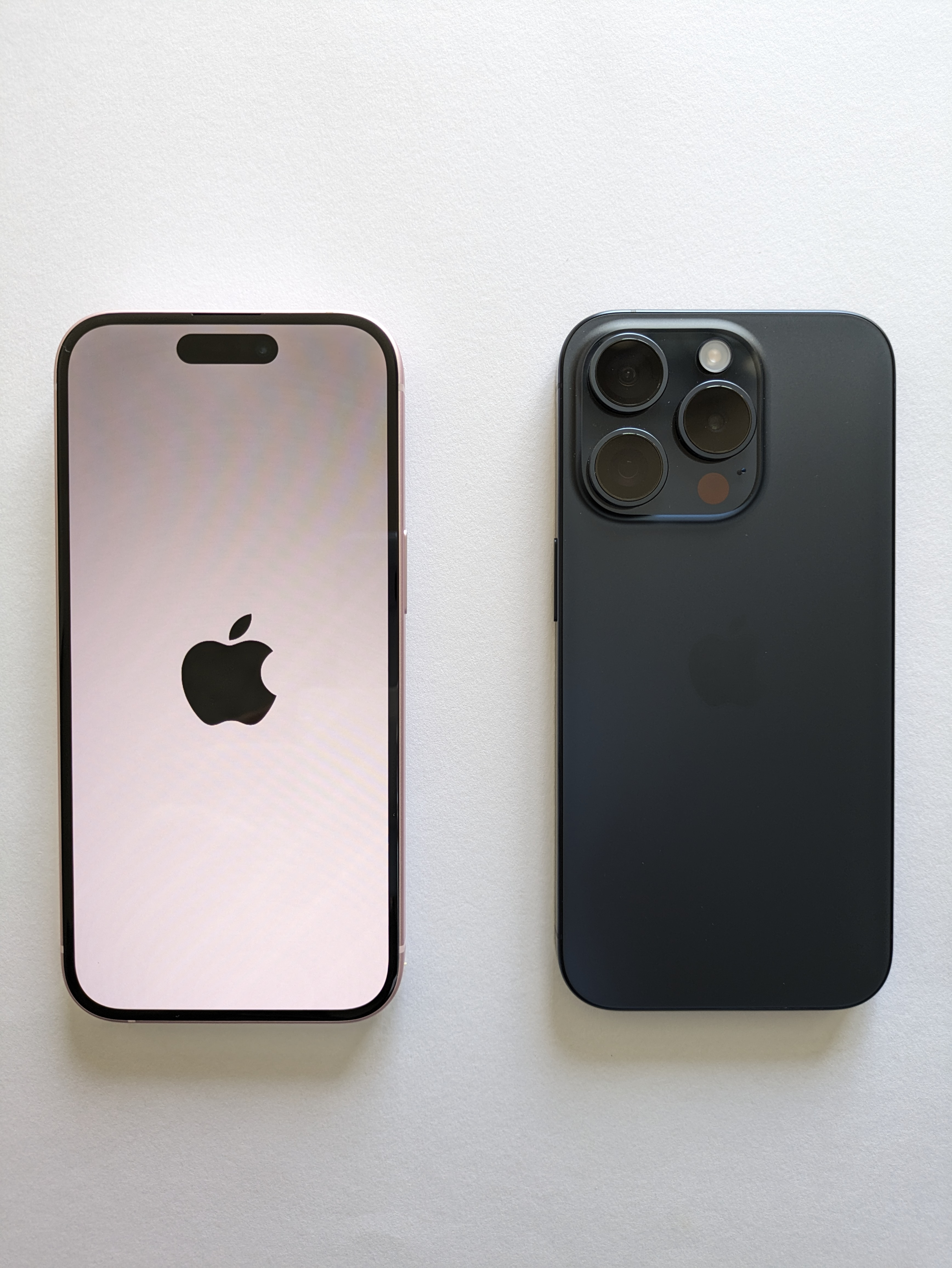
iPhone 15 Pro with 6.1-inch display

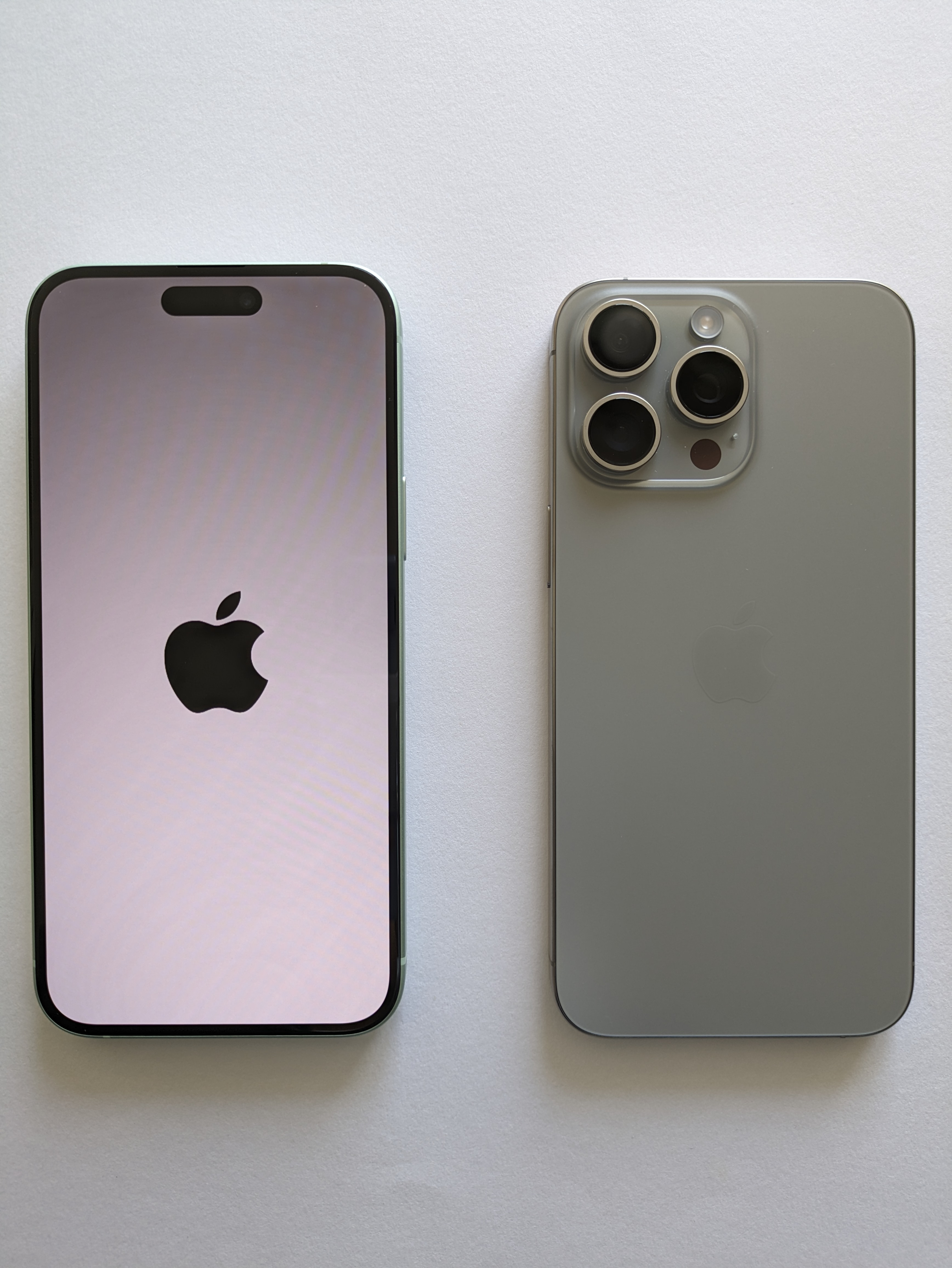
iPhone 15 Pro Max with 6.7-inch display

==== Chipset ====
The iPhone 15 Pro and Pro Max feature the Apple A17 Pro system on a chip (SoC). It is built on TSMC's N3B fabrication process. It features a redesigned Apple graphics processing unit (GPU) which adds hardware-accelerated ray tracing; during the reveal event, Apple announced that games such as Death Stranding, Resident Evil Village and Assassin's Creed Mirage (all games originally designed for consoles and PCs) would come to iOS in the future.

==== Charging and transfer speeds ====
The iPhone 15 Pro and 15 Pro Max use USB-C supporting USB 10Gbps capabilities with transfer speeds (est. up to 10 Gbit/s or 1.25 GB/s), an improvement over the iPhone 14 Pro or 14 Pro Max and the iPhone 15 or 15 Plus base models which only have USB 2.0 transfer speeds (est. up to 480 Mbit/s or 60 MB/s).

==== Video output ====
All iPhone 15 models have support for DisplayPort Alternate Mode over USB-C video output with HDR up to 4K resolution.

==== Action button ====
The iPhone 15 Pro and 15 Pro Max feature an Action button, unlike the iPhone 15 and 15 Plus, replacing the mute switch that was present on every iPhone before it. The function of the Action button can be configured by the user, but by default, the Action button toggles to silent mode. Other options include: opening a desired app, recording a voice memo, toggling a focus mode, and actively translating speech.

In 2025, Apple revealed that the ability to trigger Visual Intelligence via the action button would be added to the iPhone 15 Pro and 15 Pro Max through the iOS 18.4 update.

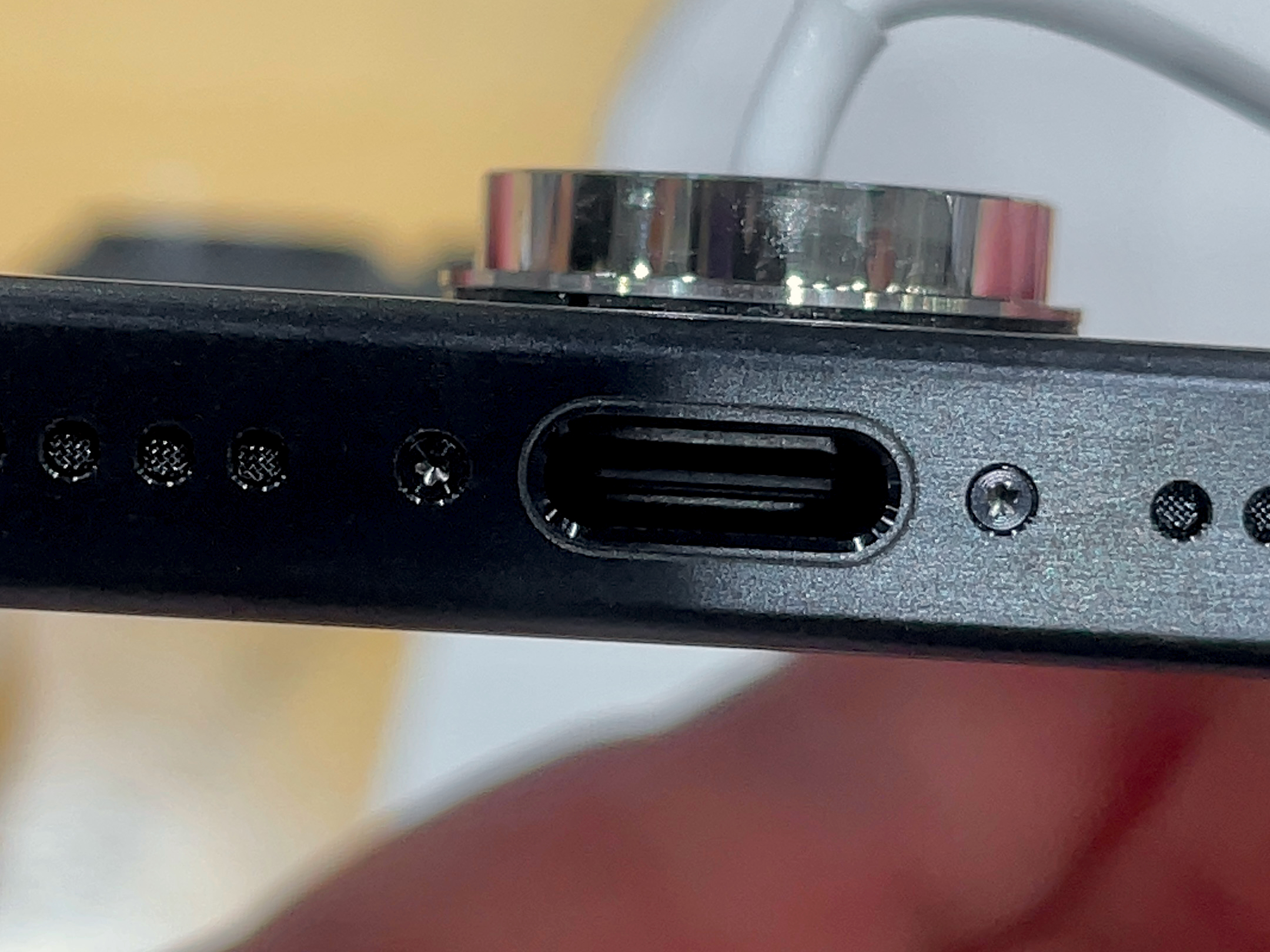
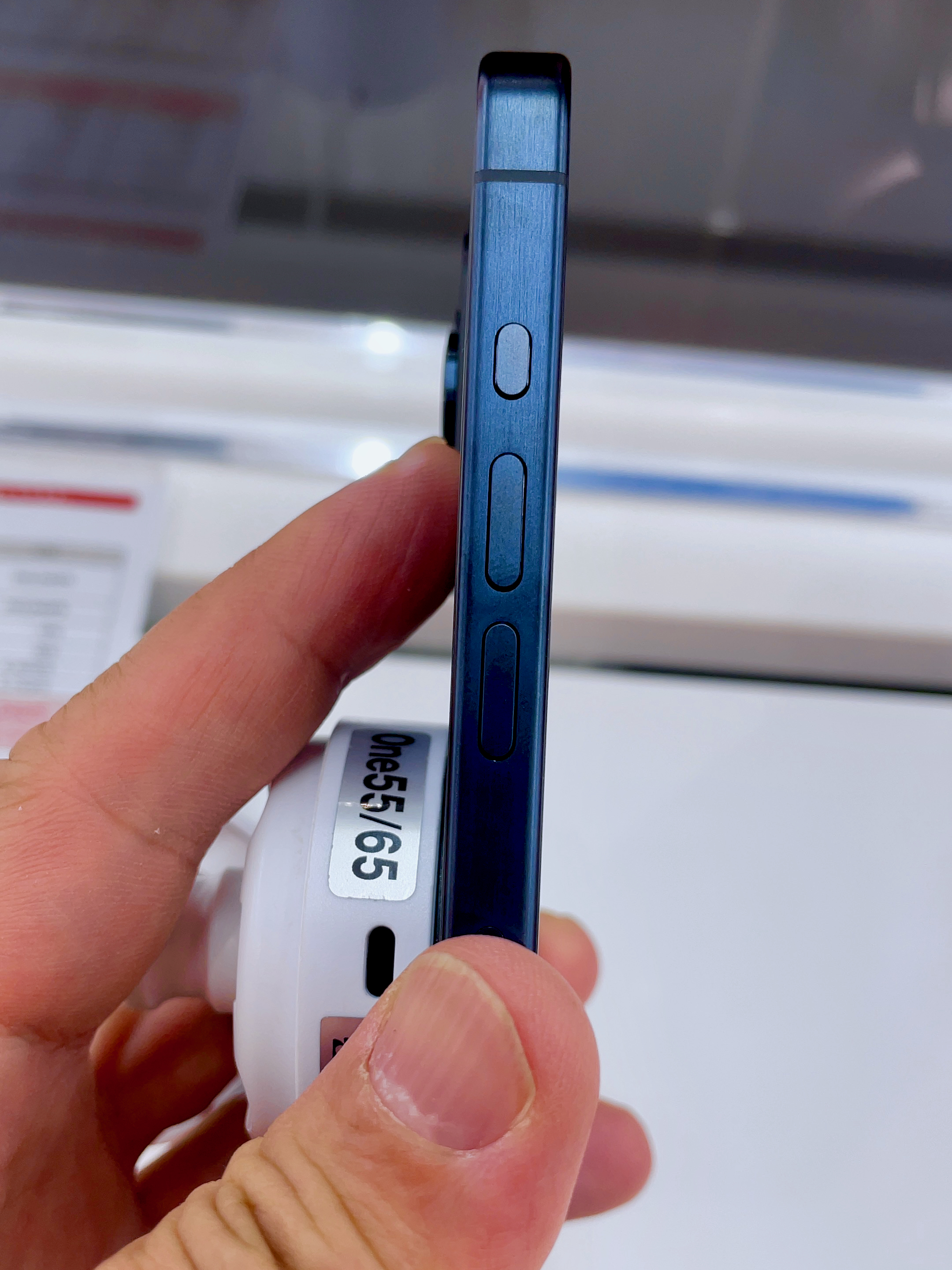
iPhone 15 Pro was announced with two new features: USB-C (left) and the Action button (right, the top button).

=== Software ===
The iPhone 15 Pro and 15 Pro Max launched with iOS 17 and can be upgraded to iOS 27 via over-the-air update (OTA).

Apple announced that the iPhone 15 Pro and 15 Pro Max are compatible with Apple Intelligence released with iOS 18.1 in October 2024.

Consistent with the UK Product Security and Telecommunications Infrastructure regulations, it will continue to receive major software updates for a minimum of five years to at least 2028.

Prior to the launch of iOS 18.4, Apple added the Visual Intelligence support for the iPhone 15 Pro and 15 Pro Max. The users of the iPhone 15 Pro or iPhone 15 Pro Max can open the Visual Intelligence by customizing the Action button or Lock Screen, or opening Control Center.

=== Detailed specs ===
Model		iPhone 15 Pro Max	iPhone 15 Pro
Picture			
Initial release operating system		iOS 17.0	
Latest release operating system		iOS 27.2.1	
Display	Screen Size	6.7 in (170 mm) (diagonal); 6.29 by 3.02 in (160 by 77 mm)	6.1 in (150 mm) (diagonal); 5.77 by 2.78 in (147 by 71 mm)
Display	Backlight	—N/a	
Display	Multi-touch	Yes	
Display	Technology	Super Retina XDR Display edge-to-edge OLED	
Display	Resolution	2796 x 1290	2556 x 1179
Display	Pixel Density (ppi)	460	
Display	Aspect Ratio	~19.5:9	
Display	Typical Max brightness ( cd/m^{2})	1000 nits	
Display	HDR Max brightness ( cd/m^{2})	1600 nits	
Display	Outdoor Max brightness ( cd/m^{2})	2000 nits	
Display	Contrast ratio (typical)	2000000:1	
Display	Fingerprint-resistant oleophobic coating	Yes	
Display	Full sRGB Display	Yes	
Display	Wide Color Display (Display P3)	Yes	
Display	True Tone Display	Yes	
Display	Night Shift	Yes	
Display	ProMotion Display	Yes	
Display	Always-On Display	Yes	
Display	HDR Display	Yes	
Display	HDR 10 Content	Yes	
Display	Dolby Vision	With HDR	
Display	Dynamic Island	Yes	
Display	Taptic	Haptic Touch	
Processor	Chip	Apple A17 Pro	
Processor	Technology Node	TSMC N3B (3 nm)	
Processor	Total Cores	6	
Processor	High Performance Cores	2	
Processor	High Efficiency Cores	4	
Processor	Clock Speed	3.78 GHz	
Processor	Bit	64-bit	
Processor	Motion Coprocessor	Embedded in SoC	
Processor	Bus width	64-bit	
Processor	Graphics Processor	Seventh generation Apple designed 6-core GPU	
Processor	Neural Engine	Seventh generation Apple designed 16-core Neural Engine (35 TOPS)	
Storage		256 GB, 512 GB, 1 TB	128 GB, 256 GB, 512 GB, 1 TB
Storage Type		NAND Flash driven by NVMe-based controller that communicates over a PCIe connection	
RAM		8 GB	
RAM Type		LPDDR5 3200 MHz	
Connector		USB-C	
Connectivity	Wi-Fi (802.11)	Wi-Fi 6E (802.11a/b/g/n/ac/6)	
Connectivity	MIMO	Yes	
Connectivity	NFC	With Reader Mode in background	
Connectivity	Express Cards	With Power Reserve	
Connectivity	Bluetooth	Bluetooth 5.3	
Connectivity	Ultra Wideband chip for spatial awareness	Yes	
Connectivity	Cellular	GSM/EDGE/UMTS/HSPA+/DC-HSDPA/Gigabit-class LTE/5G (sub-6 GHz and mmWave (US models))	
Connectivity	VoLTE	Yes	
Connectivity	Assisted GPS	Precision Dual-frequency	
Connectivity	GLONASS/GNSS	Precision Dual-frequency	
Connectivity	BeiDou	Precision Dual-frequency	
Connectivity	SIM card form-factor	Dual SIM with one Nano-SIM and one eSIM, supports dual eSIM; No physical SIM card form factor in U.S. models	
Connectivity	SIM card form-factor	Dual Nano-SIM in mainland China, Hong Kong and Macau	
Secure Authentication	Touch ID	No	
Secure Authentication	Face ID	Yes	
Safety	Emergency SOS	Via Satellite (U.S., Canada, France, Germany, Ireland, U.K., Australia, Austria, Belgium, Italy, Luxembourg, the Netherlands, New Zealand, and Portugal only)	
Safety	Crash detection	Yes	
Sensors	LiDAR sensor	Yes	
Sensors	Proximity sensor	Yes	
Sensors	Three-axis gyroscope	High dynamic range gyro	
Sensors	Accelerometer	High-g accelerometer	
Sensors	Ambient light sensor	Yes	
Sensors	Barometer	Yes	
Rear camera	Camera	48 MP Main; 12 MP Ultra Wide; 12 MP 2x Telephoto (Enabled by Quad-pixel); 12 MP 5x Telephoto	48 MP Main; 12 MP Ultra Wide; 12 MP 2x Telephoto (Enabled by Quad-pixel); 12 MP 3x Telephoto
Rear camera	Aperture	f/1.78 (Main and 2x Telephoto) f/2.2 (Ultra Wide) f/2.8 (5x Telephoto)	f/1.78 (Main and 2x Telephoto) f/2.2 (Ultra Wide) f/2.8 (3x Telephoto)
Rear camera	Pixel Size for main camera	1.22 μm (48 MP); 2.44 μm (Quad-pixel 12MP)	
Rear camera	Sensor Size for main camera	1/1.28"	
Rear camera	Optical image stabilization	Main, 2x Telephoto and 5x Telephoto; Second generation sensor-shift optical image stabilization for main and 2x telephoto camera 3D sensor‑shift optical image stabilization for 5x telephoto camera	Main, 2x Telephoto and 3x Telephoto; Second generation sensor-shift optical image stabilization for main and 2x telephoto camera
Rear camera	Auto image stabilization	Yes	
Rear camera	Element Lens	Seven-element lens (Main and 2x Telephoto)	
Rear camera	Element Lens	Six-element lens (Ultra Wide and 5x Telephoto)	Six-element lens (Ultra Wide and 3x Telephoto)
Rear camera	Night Mode	Yes	
Rear camera	Deep Fusion	Yes	
Rear camera	Photonic Engine	Yes	
Rear camera	Apple ProRAW	Yes	
Rear camera	Macro mode	Yes	
Rear camera	Photographic Styles	Yes	
Rear camera	Optical Zoom	0.5x, 1x, 2x, 5x	0.5x, 1x, 2x, 3x
Rear camera	Digital Zoom	Up to 25x	Up to 15x
Rear camera	Autofocus	100% Focus Pixels (Main, Ultra Wide and 2x Telephoto); With autofocus (5x Telephoto)	100% Focus Pixels (Main, Ultra Wide and 2x Telephoto)
Rear camera	Panorama	Up to 63 MP	
Rear camera	Portrait Mode	With Focus and Depth Control	
Rear camera	Portrait Lighting	With six effects (Natural, Studio, Contour, Stage, Stage Mono, High‑Key Mono)	
Rear camera	Lens Cover	Sapphire crystal lens cover	
Rear camera	Burst Mode	Yes	
Rear camera	Flash	Adaptive True Tone flash	
Rear camera	Live Photos	Yes	
Rear camera	Wide Color Capture	Yes	
Rear camera	HDR for photos	Smart HDR 5	
Rear camera	Video Recording	4K at 24 fps, 25 fps, 30 fps or 60 fps 1080p HD at 25 fps, 30 fps or 60 fps	
Rear camera	Cinematic video recording with shallow depth of field	4K at 25 fps or 30 fps	
Rear camera	Extended Dynamic Range Video	60 fps	
Rear camera	Dolby Vision HDR Video	60 fps	
Rear camera	ProRes Video	1080p at 30 fps for 128 GB storage 4K at 30 fps for 256 GB storage and above 4K at 60 fps with external recording	
Rear camera	Optical image stabilization for video	Main, 2x Telephoto and 5x Telephoto; Second generation sensor-shift optical image stabilization for main and 2x telephoto camera 3D sensor‑shift optical image stabilization for 5x telephoto camera	Main, 2x Telephoto and 3x Telephoto; Second generation sensor-shift optical image stabilization for main and 2x telephoto camera
Rear camera	Action Mode	Yes	
Rear camera	Optical Video Zoom	0.5x, 1x, 2x, 5x	0.5x, 1x, 2x, 3x
Rear camera	Digital Video Zoom	Up to 15x	Up to 9x
Rear camera	Slow-motion video	1080p at 120 fps or 240 fps	
Rear camera	Audio Zoom	Yes	
Rear camera	QuickTake Video	Yes	
Rear camera	Time-lapse video with stabilization	Yes	
Rear camera	Cinematic video stabilization	4K, 1080p and 720p	
Rear camera	Stereo Recording	Yes	
Front Camera	Camera	12 MP TrueDepth	
Front Camera	Aperture	f/1.9	
Front Camera	Autofocus	Yes	
Front Camera	Portrait Mode	With Focus and Depth Control	
Front Camera	Portrait Lighting	With six effects (Natural, Studio, Contour, Stage, Stage Mono, High‑Key Mono)	
Front Camera	Night mode	Yes	
Front Camera	Deep Fusion	Yes	
Front Camera	Photonic Engine	Yes	
Front Camera	Photographic Styles	Yes	
Front Camera	Animoji and Memoji	Yes	
Front Camera	Live Photos	Yes	
Front Camera	Wide color capture	Yes	
Front Camera	Retina Flash	Yes	
Front Camera	Video Recording	4K at 24 fps, 25 fps, 30 fps or 60 fps 1080p HD at 25 fps, 30 fps or 60 fps	
Front Camera	Slow-motion video	1080p at 120 fps	
Front Camera	Extended Dynamic Range Video	30 fps	
Front Camera	Dolby Vision HDR Video	4K at 60 fps	
Front Camera	ProRes Video	1080p at 30 fps for 128 GB storage 4K at 30 fps for 256 GB storage and above 4K at 60 fps with external recording	
Front Camera	HDR for photos	Smart HDR 5	
Front Camera	Cinematic video stabilization	4K, 1080p and 720p	
Front Camera	Auto Image Stabilization	Yes	
Front Camera	FaceTime	Yes	
Audio	Playback	Spatial Audio	
Audio	Dolby Atmos	Built-in speakers and headphones with Spatial Audio	
Audio	3.5 mm Jack	No	
HAC Rating		M3, T4	
Compatible with Made for iPhone Hearing aids		Yes	
Live Listen		Yes	
Materials	Front	Black glass front	
Materials	Back	Glass back	
Materials	Side	Titanium grade 5	
Colors			
Fast Charging		20 W, up to 50% charge in 30 minutes (20 W adapter sold separately)	
Wireless Charging		MagSafe and Qi 2.0 wireless charging	
Resistant		IP68 (Maximum depth of 6 meters up to 30 minutes)	
Dimensions	Height	159.9 mm (6.30 in)	146.6 mm (5.77 in)
Dimensions	Width	76.7 mm (3.02 in)	70.6 mm (2.78 in)
Dimensions	Depth	8.25 mm (0.325 in)	
Weight		221 g (7.8 oz)	187 g (6.6 oz)
Announced Date		September 12, 2023	
Released Date		September 22, 2023	
Discontinued Date		September 9, 2024	
Unsupported Date		Supported	

== Hardware issues reported ==
=== Overheating ===
Some owners claimed that their iPhones were suffering from overheating issues, reportedly reaching temperatures as high as 47 °C (117 °F). Apple has also said that the phone's titanium frame "does not contribute to the heating issue." In addition, Apple stated the cause of iPhones overheating was a software bug. Apple has attempted to address the overheating issue with iOS 17.0.3 update.

=== Power bank reverse charging ===
Some owners have found that power banks designed for USB-C devices are not working correctly with the iPhone. Some banks will not charge the iPhone at all or the iPhone will attempt to charge the power bank instead.

=== NFC ===
Some owners of BMW vehicles using its wireless charging system with the iPhone have found that the NFC chip in charge of Apple Pay and also digital car keys can stop working correctly. Apple has attempted to fix these issues with iOS 17.1.1 and 17.2 updates.

=== Durability ===
A durability test video for the iPhone 15 Pro Max showed that the back glass was more prone to cracking after the content creator JerryRigEverything applied pressure on the back glass, which caused it to crack, saying that it was unexpected. A later video, published by the same YouTuber, cited that the possible reason for this was that the back glass is no longer glued to a metal plate; this change, and the hollow spots on the phone, may cause the back glass to crack if pressure was applied on those hollow spots; on the durability test video, in some angles, the glass is noticeably caved in to the phone, further proving that it broke due to a hollow spot on the phone. Additional testing by Consumer Reports found that the durability of the iPhone 15 Pro Max was generally excellent, with the back glass not breaking after 50 drops.

== Repairability ==
A September 2023 report by iFixit found that repairability on the new iPhones was much worse compared to the 14 series due to various software locking issues, forcing people to buy new parts and repair machines specifically by Apple.

The iPhone 15 Pro and 15 Pro Max access the battery from the front, but the back glass is easily replaceable unlike the iPhone 14 Pro and 14 Pro Max.

== Release and critical reception ==
The devices were unveiled in 2023, alongside the iPhone 15 and 15 Plus during the September 12 Apple Event at Apple Park in Cupertino, California. Pre-orders began on September 15, and the devices were made available to the public on September 22. The iPhone 15 Pro and 15 Pro Max were discontinued on September 9, 2024, following the announcement of the iPhone 16 Pro and 16 Pro Max.

GSMarena gave the phone 4.5 out of 5 stars. While its display, camera and speakers were praised, its high price was noted as a weak point. NotebookCheck gave it 91 out of 100 and praised its durability.

== See also ==
- List of longest smartphone telephoto lenses

Preceded by iPhone 14 Pro / 14 Pro Max	iPhone; 17th generation alongside iPhone 15 / 15 Plus	Succeeded by iPhone 16 Pro / 16 Pro Max
