= Active EMI reduction =

In the field of EMC, active EMI reduction (or active EMI filtering) refers to techniques aimed to reduce or to filter Electromagnetic interference (EMI) making use of active electronic components. Active EMI reduction contrasts with passive filtering techniques, such as RC filters, LC filters RLC filters, which includes only passive electrical components. Hybrid solutions including both active and passive elements exist. Standards concerning conducted and radiated emissions published by IEC and FCC set the maximum noise level allowed for different classes of electrical devices. The frequency range of interest spans from 150 kHz to 30 MHz for conducted emissions and from 30 MHz to 40 GHz for radiated emissions. Meeting these requirements and guaranteeing the functionality of an electrical apparatus subject to electromagnetic interference are the main reason to include an EMI filter. In an electrical system, power converters, i.e. DC/DC converters, inverters and rectifiers, are the major sources of conducted EMI, due to their high-frequency switching ratio which gives rise to unwanted fast current and voltage transients. Since power electronics is nowadays spread in many fields, from power industrial application to automotive industry, EMI filtering has become necessary. In other fields, such as the telecommunication industry where the major focus is on radiated emissions, other techniques have been developed for EMI reduction, such as spread spectrum clocking which makes use of digital electronics, or electromagnetic shielding.

== Working principle ==
The concept behind active EMI reduction has already been implemented previously in acoustics with the active noise control and it can be described considering the following three different blocks:

- Sensing stage: the undesired EMI noise, which can be treated either as a high-frequency current superimposed on the functional current or as a voltage, is sensed and sent to the electronic stage. The sensor could be a current transformer to register currents or a capacitive branch to sense voltages. The detected signal should be an exact copy of the noise, both in magnitude and phase.
- Electronic stage: the recorded signal is amplified and inverted exploiting electronics. Analog devices, e.g. OpAmps and InAmps in different configurations or transistors, are used. For conducted emission frequencies, high gain and wide bandwidth can be achieved with many available devices. This electronic block requires an external power supply.
- Injecting stage: the elaborated signal is eventually injected back into the system with opposite phase in order to achieve the noise reduction or cancellation. Currents can be injected using a capacitive branch, while voltages can be induced with a series transformer.

The active EMI reduction device should not affect the normal operation of the raw system. Active filters are intended to act only on the high-frequency noises produced by the system and should not modify normal operation at DC or power-line frequency.

== Filter topologies ==
The EMI noise can be categorized as common mode (CM) and differential mode (DM).

Depending on the noise component that should be compensated, different topologies and configurations are possible. Two families of active filter exist, the feedback and the feed forward controlled: the first detects the noise at the receiver and generates a compensation signal to suppress the noise; the latter detects the noise at the noise source and generates an opposite signal to cancel out the noise.

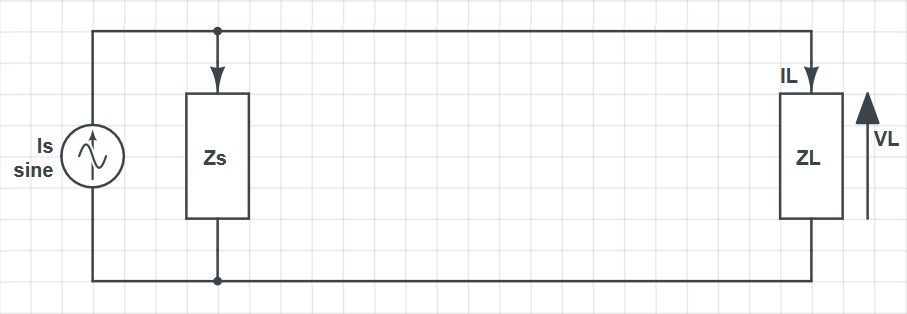
Fig. 1: Schematic representation of single frequency noise circuit.

Even though the spectrum of an EMI noise is composed by several spectral components, a single frequency at the time is taken into account to make possible a simple circuit representation, as shown in Fig. 1. The noise source $I_s$ is represented as a sinusoidal source with its Norton representation which delivers a sinusoidal current $I_L$ to the load impedance $Z_L$.

The target of the filter is to suppress every single frequency noise current flowing through the load, and in order to understand how it achieves the task, two very basic circuit elements are introduced: the nullator and the norator. The nullator is an element whose voltage and current are always zero, while the norator is an element whose voltage and current can assume any value. For example, by placing the nullator in series or in parallel to the load impedance we can either cancel the single frequency noise current or voltage across $Z_L$. Then the norator must be placed to satisfy the Kirchhoff's current and voltage laws (KVL and KCL). The active EMI filter always tries to keep a constant value of current or voltage at the load, in this specific case this value is equal to zero. The combination of a nullator and a norator forms a nullor, which is an element that can be represented by an ideal controlled voltage/current source. The series and parallel combinations of Norator and Nullator gives four possible configurations of ideal controlled sources which, for the case of feedback topology, are shown in Fig. 2 and in Fig. 3 for the feedback topology.

The four implementation that can be actualized are:

- Current sensing - Current injecting (current controlled current source)
- Voltage sensing - Current injecting (voltage controlled current source)
- Current sensing - Voltage injecting (current controlled voltage source)
- Voltage sensing - Voltage injecting (voltage controlled voltage source)

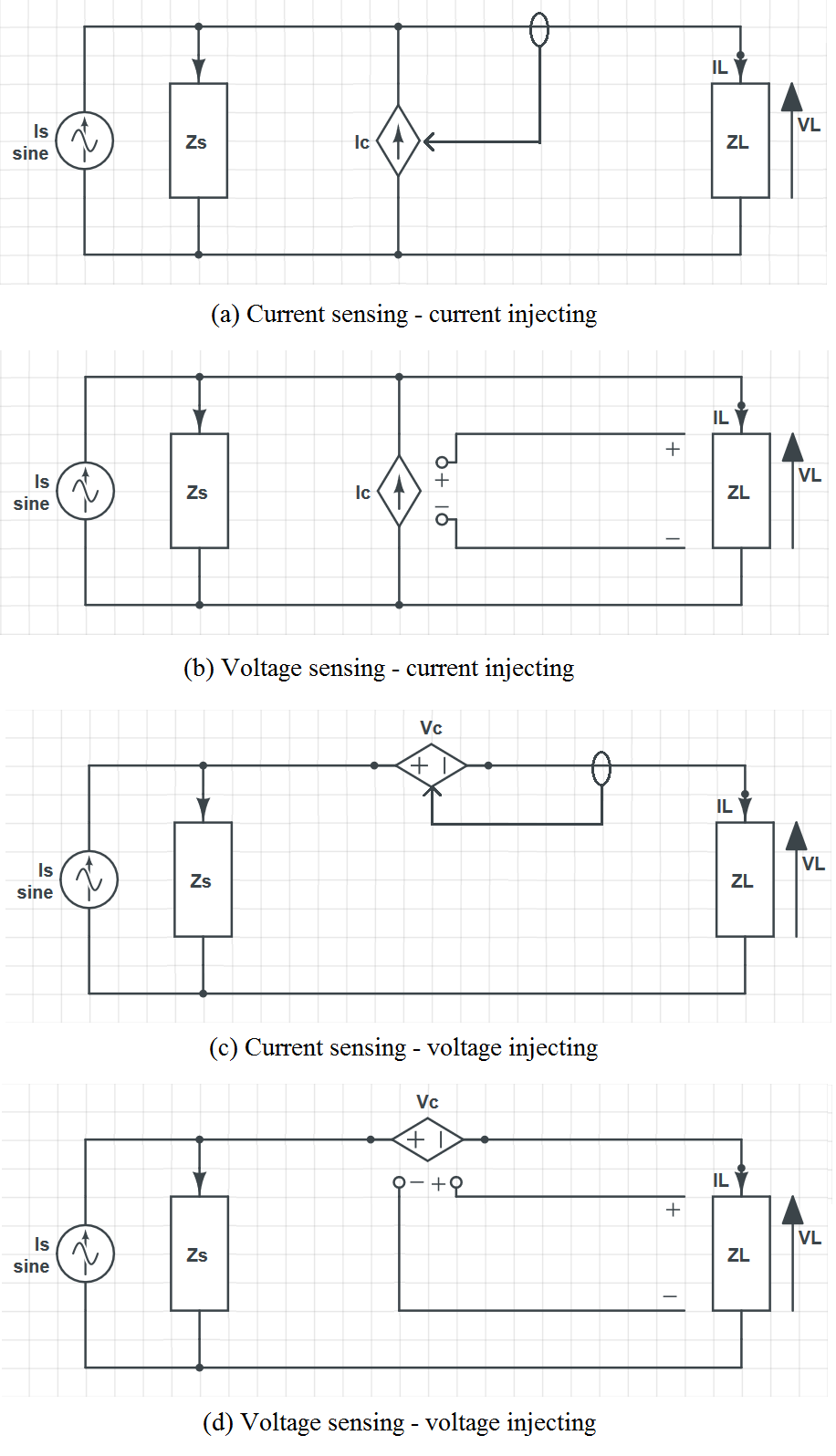
Fig. 2: Schematics of the possible configurations for feedback topology.

=== Feedback ===
To assess the performances and the effectiveness of the filter, the Insertion loss (IL) can be evaluated in each case. The IL, expressed in dB, represents the achievable noise attenuation and it is defined as:

$IL=20log_{10}\frac{|V_{without}|}{|V_{with}|}$

where $V_{without}$ is the load voltage measured without the filter and $V_{with}$ is the load voltage with the filter included in the system. By applying KVL, KCL and Ohm's law to the circuit, these two voltages can be calculated. If $A$ is the filter's gain, i.e. the transfer function between the sensed and the injected signal, IL results to be:

Type	Filter's gain (A)	Insertion Loss (IL)
(a) I sensing - I injecting	Current gain $I_c=A*I_L$	$1+A*\frac{Z_s}{Z_s+Z_L}$
(b) V sensing - I injecting	Trans-impedance gain $I_c=A*V_L$	$1+\frac{A}{Y_s+Y_L}$
(c) I sensing - V injecting	Trans-admittance gain $V_c=A*I_L$	$1+\frac{A}{Z_s+Z_L}$
(d) V sensing - V injecting	Voltage gain $V_c=A*V_L$	$1+A*\frac{Z_L}{Z_L+Z_s}$

Larger IL implies a greater attenuation, while a smaller than unity IL implies an undesired noise signal amplification caused by the active filter. For example, type (a) (current sensing and compensation) and (d) (voltage sensing and compensation) filters, if the mismatch between $Z_L$ and $Z_s$ is large enough so that one of the two becomes negligible compared to the other, provide ILs irrespective of the system impedances, which means the higher the gain, the better the performances. The large mismatch between $Z_L$ and $Z_s$ occurs in most of real applications, where the noise source impedance $Z_s$ is much smaller (for the differential mode test setup) or much larger (for the common mode test setup) than the load impedance $Z_L$, that, in standard test setup, is equal to the $50\Omega$ LISN impedance. In these two cases ILs can be approximated to:

Type	Impedances	Approx. IL
(a) I sensing - I injecting	$Z_s$>>$Z_L$	$1+A$
(d) V sensing - V injecting	$Z_s$<<$Z_L$	$1+A$

On the other hand, in the type (c) (current sensing and voltage compensation) active filter, the gain of the active filter should be larger than the total impedance of the given system to obtain the maximum IL. This means that the filter should provide a high series impedance between the noise source and the receiver to block the noise current. Similar conclusion can be made for a type (b) (voltage detecting and current compensating) active filter; the equivalent admittance of the active filter should be much higher than the total admittance of the system without the filter, so that the active filter reroutes the noise current and minimizes the noise voltage at the receiver port. In this way, active filters try to block and divert the noise propagation path as conventional passive LC filters do. Nevertheless, active filters employing type (b) or (c) topologies require a gain A larger than the total impedance (or admittance) of the raw system and, in other words, their ILs are always dependent on system impedance $Z_L$ and $Z_s$, even though the mismatch between them is large.

=== Feed forward ===
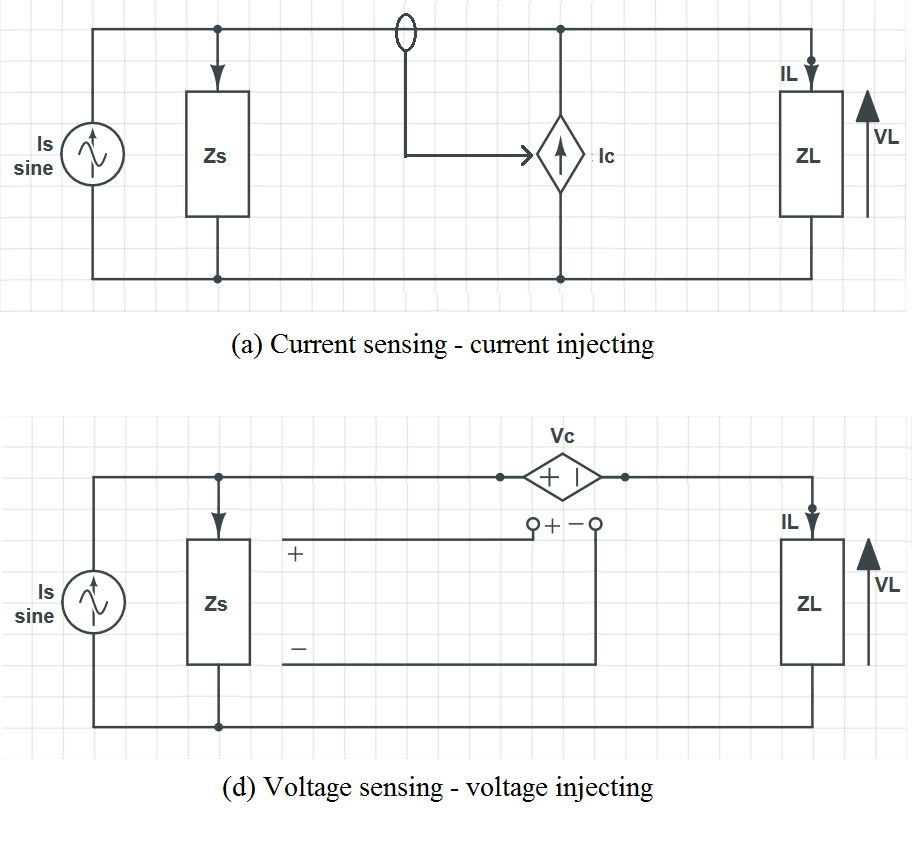
Fig. 3: Schematics of the possible configurations for feed forward topology.

While feedback filters register the noise at load side and inject the compensation signal at source side, the feed forward devices do the opposite: the sensing is at source end and the compensation at load port. For this reason, there cannot be feedforward-type implementation for type (b) and (c). Type (a) (current sensing and injecting) and type (d) (voltage sensing and injecting) can be implemented and the calculated ILs result to be:

Type	Filter's gain (A)	Insertion Loss (IL)
(a)	Current gain $I_c=A*I_L$	$\frac{1}{1-A}(1-\frac{A*Z_L}{Z_L+Z_s})$
(d)	Voltage gain $V_c=A*V_L$	$\frac{1}{1-A}(1-\frac{A*Z_s}{Z_s+Z_L})$

Considering also in these two cases the condition for maximum noise reduction, i.e. maximum IL, it can be achieved when the filter's gain is equal to one. If $A\rightarrow 1^-$, it follows that $IL\rightarrow \infty$. It can also be noted that, if $A\rightarrow 1^+$or, generally speaking, $A > 1$, the insertion loss becomes negative and thus the active filter amplifies the noise instead of reducing it.

== Active vs passive ==
- EMI passive filter performances depend upon the impedances of the surrounding electrical system, while, in some configurations, it does not happen for active filtering.
- Active filters requires an external power supply for their internal circuitry.
- Active filters have to deal with the stability of the electronic components.
- As the functional current and voltage of a system increase, passive components increase in size and price. This issue does not affect active filters since they deal only with the detected high-frequency small signal.

== See also ==
- Passive filter
- Electromagnetic compatibility
- Electromagnetic interference
