= USB 3.0 =

Third major version of the Universal Serial Bus standard

- Type: USB

Production history
- Designed: November 2008; 18 years ago
- Manufacturer: USB 3.0 Promoter Group (Hewlett-Packard, Intel, Microsoft, NEC, ST-Ericsson, and Texas Instruments)
- Superseded: USB 2.0 Hi-Speed
- Superseded by: USB 3.1, USB 3.2, USB4 (July 2013, September 2017, August 2019)

General specifications
- Length: Standard‑A plug: 12 mm Standard‑B plug: 12 mm Type‑C (USB‑C) plug: 6.65 mm
- Width: Standard‑A plug: 12 mm Standard‑B plug: 8 mm Micro‑A & Micro‑B plugs: 12.2 mm Type‑C (USB‑C) plug: 8.25 mm
- Height: Standard‑A plug: 4.5 mm Standard‑B plug: 10.44 mm Micro‑A & Micro‑B plugs: 1.8 mm Type‑C (USB‑C) plug: 2.40 mm
- Daisy chain: No
- Audio signal: No
- Video signal: No
- Pins: Type‑C, 24 (plug 22); Micro, 10; Standard, 9)
- Connector: USB-C (USB Type‑C), USB 3.0 Standard‑A, USB 3.0 Standard‑B, Powered‑B, USB 3.0 Micro‑A, USB 3.0 Micro‑B, USB 3.0 Micro‑AB receptacle

Electrical
- Max. voltage: 5V
- Max. current: 900 mA; 1.5 A (BC 1.1/1.2, USB 3.2 single-lane); 3 A (USB 3.2 multi-lane Type‑C)

Data
- Data signal: Yes
- Bitrate: 5 Gbit/s (raw data rate: 500 MB/s, USB 3.0); 10 Gbit/s (1.212 GB/s), § USB 3.1; 20 Gbit/s (2.422 GB/s), § USB 3.2

Universal Serial Bus 3.0 (USB 3.0), marketed as SuperSpeed USB, is the third major version of the Universal Serial Bus (USB) standard for interfacing computers and electronic devices. It was released in November 2008. The USB 3.0 specification defined a new architecture and protocol, named SuperSpeed, which included a new lane for providing full-duplex data transfers that physically required five additional wires and pins, while also adding a new signal coding scheme (8b/10b symbols, 5 Gbit/s; also known later as Gen 1), and preserving the USB 2.0 architecture and protocols and therefore keeping the original four pins and wires for the USB 2.0 backward-compatibility, resulting in nine wires in total and nine or ten pins at connector interfaces (ID-pin is not wired). The new transfer rate, marketed as SuperSpeed USB (SS), can transfer signals at up to 5 Gbit/s (with raw data rate of 500 MB/s after encoding overhead), which is about 10 times faster than High-Speed (maximum for USB 2.0 standard). In USB 3.0 Type‑A and usually also Type-B connectors the visible inside insulators are often blue, to distinguish them from USB 2.0 connectors, as recommended by the specification, and by the initials SS.

USB 3.1, released in July 2013, is the successor specification that fully replaces the USB 3.0 specification. USB 3.1 preserves the existing SuperSpeed USB architecture and protocol with its operation mode (8b/10b symbols, 5 Gbit/s), giving it the label USB 3.1 Gen 1. USB 3.1 introduced an Enhanced SuperSpeed System—while preserving and incorporating the SuperSpeed architecture and protocol (aka SuperSpeed USB)—with an additional SuperSpeedPlus architecture adding and providing a new coding schema (128b/132b symbols) and protocol named SuperSpeedPlus (aka SuperSpeedPlus USB, sometimes marketed as SuperSpeed+ or SS+) while defining a new transfer mode called USB 3.1 Gen 2 with a signal speed of 10 Gbit/s and a raw data rate of 1212 MB/s over existing Type‑A, Type‑B, and Type‑C (USB‑C) connections, more than twice the rate of USB 3.0 (also known as Gen 1). Backward-compatibility is still given by the parallel USB 2.0 implementation. USB 3.1 Gen 2 Standard‑A and Standard‑B connectors are often teal-colored, though this is nonstandard. The standard recommends that all Standard‑A plugs and receptacles capable of USB 3, including those capable of Gen 2, have blue insulators, specifically Pantone 300 C. It makes no mention of teal, or Standard‑B connector color, and all other Type‑A and Type‑B connectors—Micro and Mini—are required to have white, black, or grey insulators for Type‑A, ‑B, and ‑AB, respectively.

USB 3.2, released in September 2017, fully replaces the USB 3.1 specification. The USB 3.2 specification added a second lane to the Enhanced SuperSpeed System besides other enhancements, so that SuperSpeedPlus USB implements the Gen 2×1 (formerly known as USB 3.1 Gen 2), and the two new Gen 1×2 and Gen 2×2 operation modes while operating on two lanes. The SuperSpeed architecture and protocol (also known as SuperSpeed USB) still implements the one-lane Gen 1×1 (formerly known as USB 3.1 Gen 1) operation mode. Therefore, two-lane operations, namely USB 3.2 Gen 1×2 (10 Gbit/s with raw data rate of 1 GB/s after encoding overhead) and USB 3.2 Gen 2×2 (20 Gbit/s, 2.422 GB/s), are only possible with Full-Featured Fabrics (host, hubs, peripheral device, and fully wired cables and plugs with 24 pins). As of 2023, USB 3.2 Gen 1×2 and Gen 2×2 are not implemented on many products yet; Intel started to include them in its LGA 1200 Rocket Lake chipsets (500 series) in January 2021 and AMD in its LGA 1718 AM5 chipsets in September 2022, and Apple never provided them. USB 3.2 Gen 1×1 (5 Gbit/s) and Gen 2×1 (10 Gbit/s) implementations have become quite common. Backward-compatibility is given by the parallel USB 2.0 implementation.

== Overview ==
A deprecated SuperSpeed USB 5Gbps packaging logo

USB 5Gbps port logo

The USB 3.0 specification is similar to USB 2.0, but with many improvements and an alternative implementation. Earlier USB concepts such as endpoints and the four transfer types (bulk, control, isochronous and interrupt) are preserved but the protocol and electrical interface are different. The specification defines a physically separate channel to carry USB 3.0 traffic. The changes in this specification are in the following areas:

- Transfer speed – USB 3.0 adds a new transfer type called SuperSpeed or SS, 5 Gbit/s (electrically, it is more similar to PCI Express 2.0 and SATA than USB 2.0).
- Increased bandwidth – USB 3.0 uses two unidirectional data paths instead of one: one to receive data and the other to transmit.
- Power management – U0 to U3 link power management states are defined.
- Improved bus use – a new feature is added (using packets NRDY and ERDY) to let a device asynchronously notify the host of its readiness, with no need for polling.
- Support for rotating media – the bulk protocol is updated with a new feature called Stream Protocol that allows a large number of logical streams within an Endpoint.

USB 3.0 has transmission speeds of up to 5 Gbit/s, or 5000 Mbit/s, about ten times as fast as USB 2.0 (0.48 Gbit/s) without considering that USB 3.0 is full duplex whereas USB 2.0 is half duplex. This gives USB 3.0 a potential total bidirectional bandwidth twenty times as large as that of USB 2.0. Considering flow control, packet framing and protocol overhead, applications can have 450 MB/s of bandwidth available to them.

=== Architecture and features ===
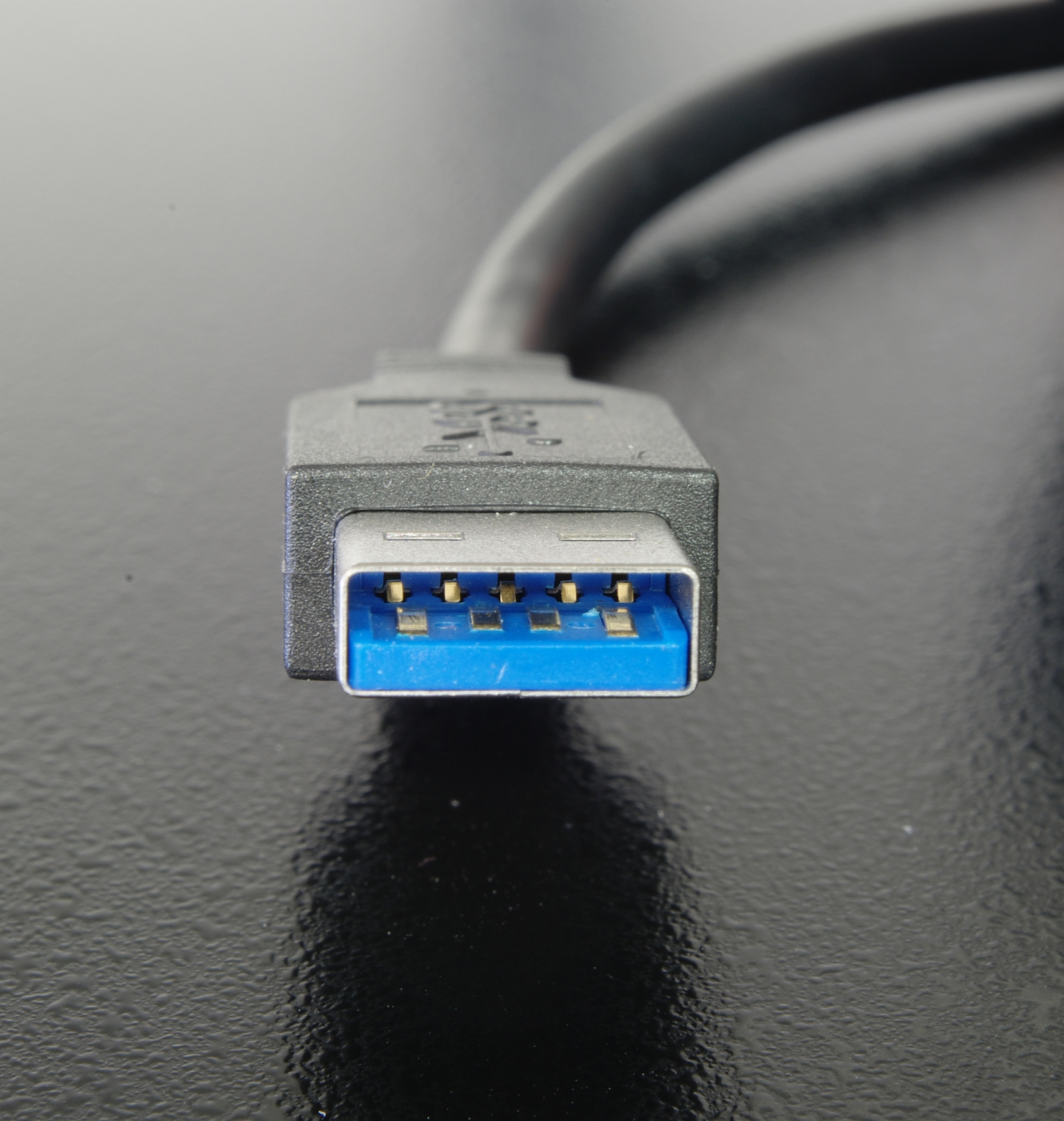
Front view of a USB 3.0 Standard‑A plug, showing its front row of four pins for power and USB 1.x/2.0, and a second row of five pins for the later USB 3.0 connectivity. The insulator is in the USB 3.0 standard blue color, Pantone 300 C.

In USB 3.0, dual-bus architecture is used to allow both USB 2.0 (Low Speed, Full Speed, or High Speed) and USB 3.0 (SuperSpeed) operations to take place simultaneously, thus providing backward compatibility. The structural topology is the same, consisting of a tiered star topology with a root hub at level 0 and hubs at lower levels to provide bus connectivity to devices.

=== Data transfer and synchronization ===
The SuperSpeed transaction is initiated by a host request, followed by a response from the peripheral device. The peripheral either accepts the request or rejects it; if accepted, the peripheral device sends data or accepts data from the host. If the endpoint is halted, the peripheral responds with a STALL handshake. If there is lack of buffer space or data, it responds with a Not Ready (NRDY) signal to tell the host that it is not able to process the request. When the peripheral device is ready, it sends an Endpoint Ready (ERDY) to the host which then reschedules the transaction.

The use of unicast and the limited number of multicast packets, combined with asynchronous notifications, enables links that are not actively passing packets to be put into reduced power states, which allows better power management.

USB 3.0 uses a spread-spectrum clock varying by up to 5000 ppm at 33 kHz to reduce EMI. As a result, the receiver needs to continually "chase" the clock to recover the data. Clock recovery is helped by the 8b/10b encoding and other designs.

=== Data encoding ===
The SuperSpeed bus provides for a transfer mode at a nominal rate of 5.0 Gbit/s, in addition to the three existing transfer modes. Accounting for the encoding overhead, the raw data throughput is 4 Gbit/s, and in the specification it is considered reasonable to achieve 3.2 Gbit/s (400 MB/s) or more in practice.

All data is sent as a stream of eight-bit (one-byte) segments that are scrambled and converted into 10-bit symbols via 8b/10b encoding; this helps prevent transmissions from generating electromagnetic interference (EMI). Scrambling is implemented using a free-running linear feedback shift register (LFSR). The LFSR is reset whenever a COM symbol is sent or received.

Unlike previous standards, the USB 3.0 standard does not specify a maximum cable length, requiring only that all cables meet an electrical specification: for copper cabling with AWG 26 wires, the maximum practical length is 3 meters (10 ft).

=== Power and charging ===
As with earlier versions of USB, USB 3.0 provides power at 5 volts nominal. The available current for low-power (one unit load) SuperSpeed devices is 150 mA, an increase from the 100 mA defined in USB 2.0. For high-power SuperSpeed devices, the limit is six unit loads, or 900 mA (4.5 W)—almost twice USB 2.0's 500 mA.

USB 3.0 ports may implement other USB specifications for increased power, including the USB Battery Charging Specification for up to 1.5 A or 7.5 W, or, in the case of USB 3.1, the USB Power Delivery Specification for charging the host device up to 100 W.

=== Naming scheme ===
Starting with the USB 3.2 specification, USB-IF introduced a new naming scheme. To help companies with branding of the different operation modes, USB-IF recommended branding the 5, 10, and 20 Gbit/s capabilities as SuperSpeed USB 5Gbps, SuperSpeed USB 10 Gbps, and SuperSpeed USB 20 Gbps, respectively. In 2023, they were replaced again, replacing "SuperSpeed" with USB 5Gbps, USB 10Gbps, and USB 20Gbps, and introducing new Packaging and Port logos.

== Availability ==
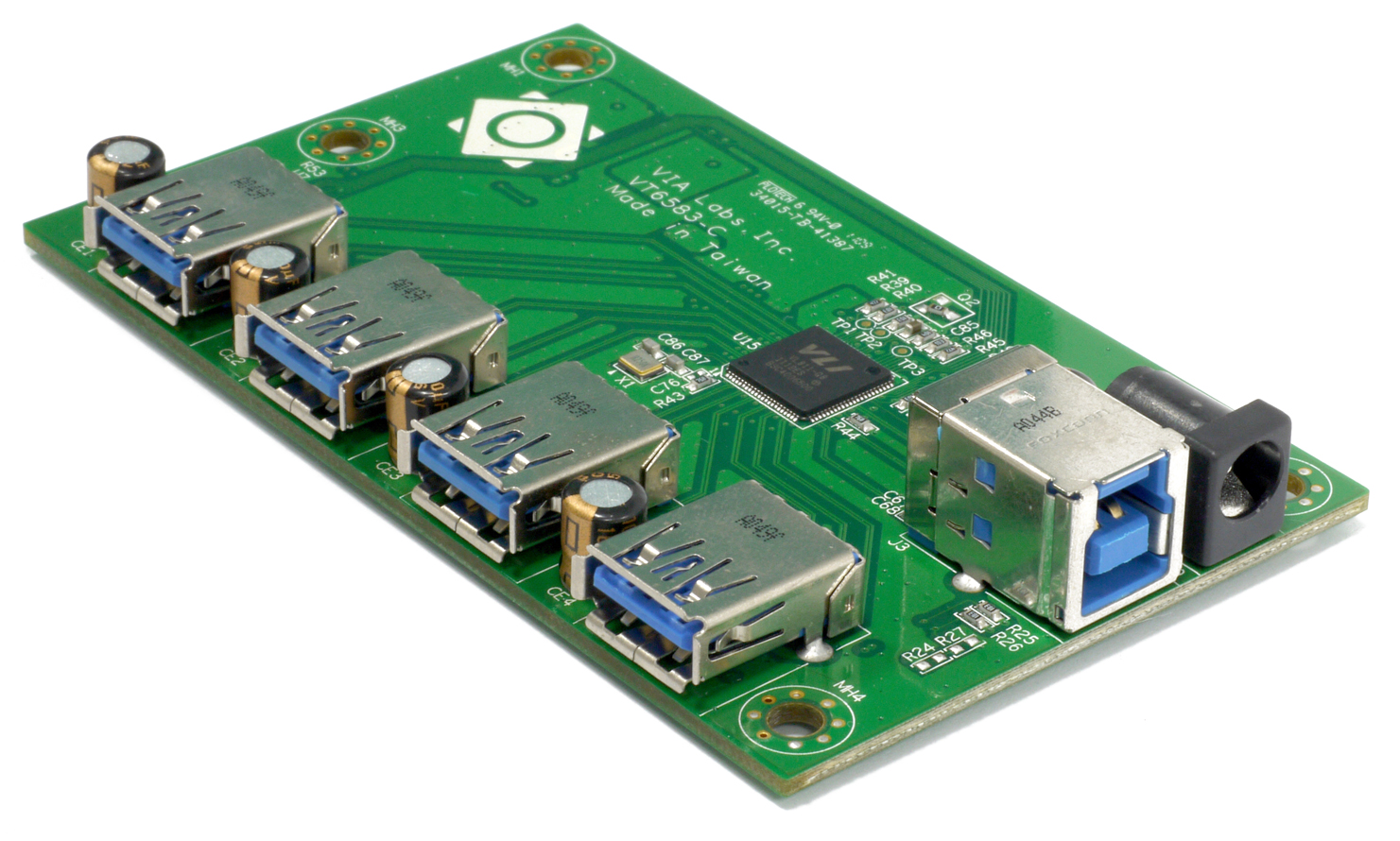
Internal circuit board and connectors of a USB 3.0 four-port hub, using a VIA Technologies chipset

The USB 3.0 Promoter Group announced on 17 November 2008 that the specification of version 3.0 had been completed and had made the transition to the USB Implementers Forum (USB-IF), the managing body of USB specifications. This move effectively opened the specification to hardware developers for implementation in future products.

The first USB 3.0 consumer products were announced and shipped by Buffalo Technology in November 2009, while the first certified USB 3.0 consumer products were announced on 5 January 2010, at the Las Vegas Consumer Electronics Show (CES), including two motherboards by Asus and Gigabyte Technology.

Manufacturers of USB 3.0 host controllers include, but are not limited to, Renesas Electronics, Fresco Logic, ASMedia, Etron, VIA Technologies, Texas Instruments, NEC and Nvidia. As of November 2010, Renesas and Fresco Logic have passed USB-IF certification. Motherboards for Intel's Sandy Bridge processors have been seen with Asmedia and Etron host controllers as well. On 28 October 2010, Hewlett-Packard released the HP Envy 17 3D featuring a Renesas USB 3.0 host controller several months before some of their competitors. AMD worked with Renesas to add its USB 3.0 implementation into its chipsets for its 2011 platforms. At CES2011, Toshiba unveiled a laptop called "Qosmio X500" that included USB 3.0 and Bluetooth 3.0, and Sony released a new series of Sony VAIO laptops that would include USB 3.0. As of April 2011, the Inspiron and Dell XPS series were available with USB 3.0 ports, and, as of May 2012, the Dell Latitude laptop series were as well; yet the USB root hosts failed to work at SuperSpeed under Windows 8.

=== Adding to existing equipment ===
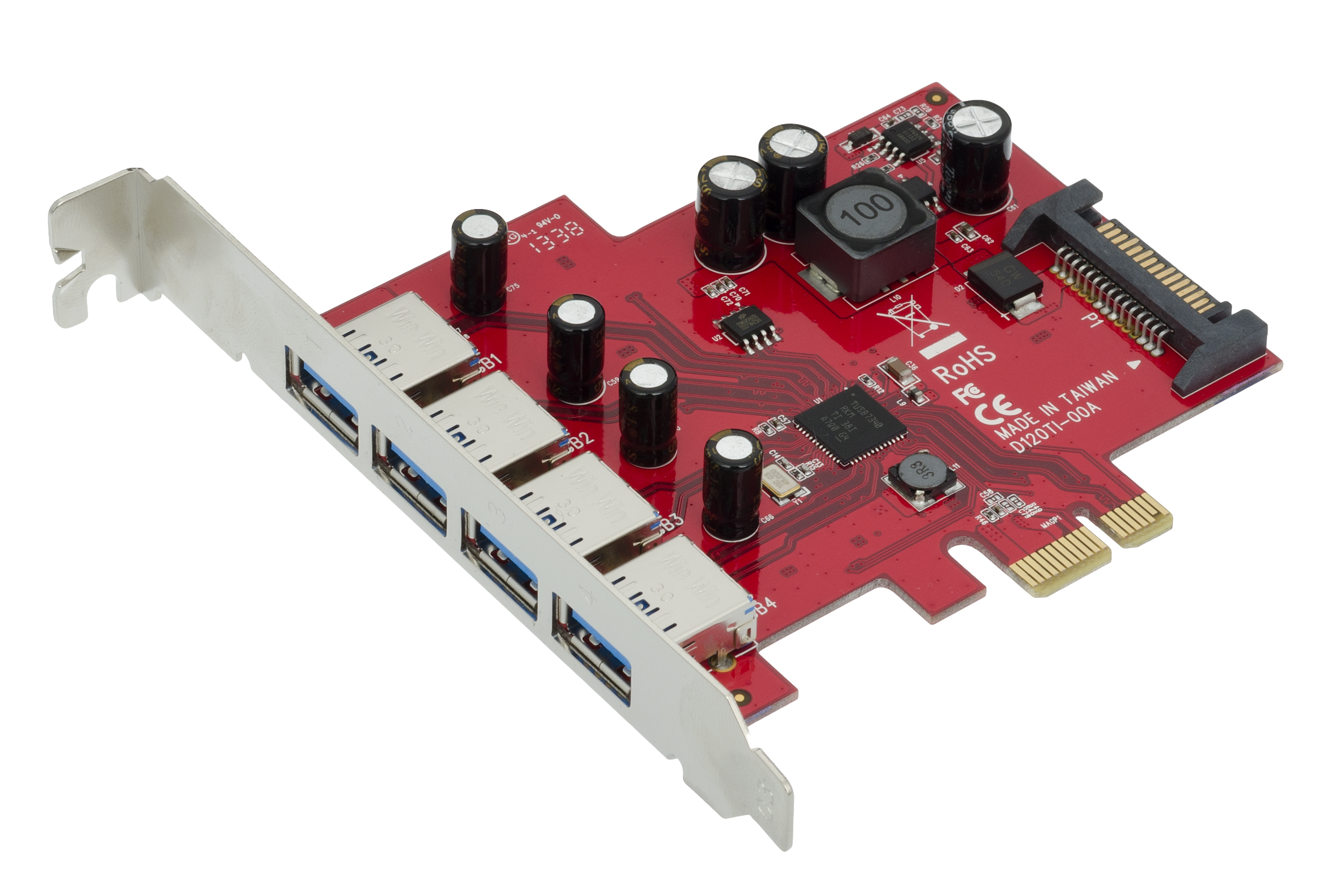
A USB 3.0 controller in the form of a PCI Express expansion card.

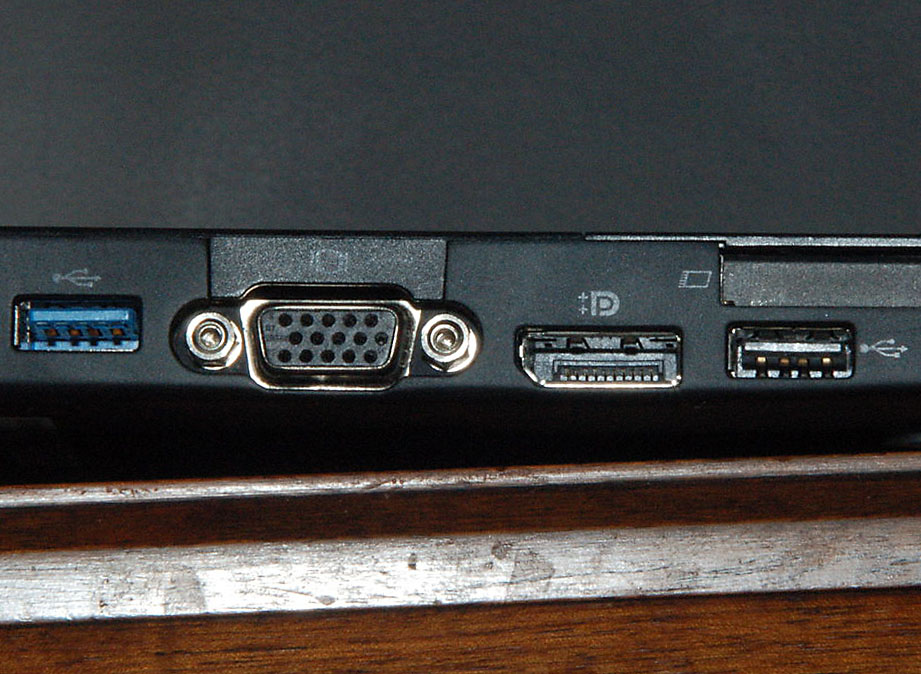
Side connectors on a laptop computer. Left to right: USB 3.0 Standard‑A (host) port (the five additional contacts for USB 3 visible on the underside of the tongue), VGA connector, DisplayPort connector, USB 2.0 Standard‑A (host) port.

On the motherboards of desktop PCs which have PCI Express (PCIe) slots (or the older PCI standard), USB 3.0 support can be added as a PCI Express expansion card. In addition to an empty PCIe slot on the motherboard, many "PCI Express to USB 3.0" expansion cards must be connected to a power supply such as a Molex adapter or external power supply, in order to power many USB 3.0 devices such as mobile phones, or external hard drives that have no power source other than USB; as of 2011, this is often used to supply two to four USB 3.0 ports with the full 0.9 A (4.5 W) of power that each USB 3.0 port is capable of (while also transmitting data), whereas the PCI Express slot itself cannot supply the required amount of power.

If faster connections to storage devices are the reason to consider USB 3.0, an alternative is to use eSATAp, possibly by adding an inexpensive expansion slot bracket that provides an eSATAp port; some external hard disk drives provide both USB (2.0 or 3.0) and eSATAp interfaces. To ensure compatibility between motherboards and peripherals, all USB-certified devices must be approved by the USB Implementers Forum (USB-IF). At least one complete end-to-end test system for USB 3.0 designers is available on the market.

=== Adoption ===
The USB Promoter Group announced the release of USB 3.0 in November 2008. On 5 January 2010, the USB-IF announced the first two certified USB 3.0 motherboards, one by ASUS and one by Giga-Byte Technology. Previous announcements included Gigabyte's October 2009 list of seven P55 chipset USB 3.0 motherboards, and an Asus motherboard that was cancelled before production.

Commercial controllers were expected to enter into volume production in the first quarter of 2010. On 14 September 2009, Freecom announced a USB 3.0 external hard drive. On 4 January 2010, Seagate announced a small portable HDD bundled with an additional USB 3.0 ExpressCard, targeted for laptops (or desktops with ExpressCard slot addition) at the CES in Las Vegas Nevada.

The Linux kernel mainline has contained support for USB 3.0 since version 2.6.31, which was released in September 2009.

The FreeBSD has supported USB 3.0 since version 8.2, which was released in February 2011.

Windows 8 was the first Microsoft operating system to offer built in support for USB 3.0. In Windows 7 support was not included with the initial release of the operating system. However, drivers that enable support for Windows 7 are available through websites of hardware manufacturers.

Intel released its first chipset with integrated USB 3.0 ports in 2012 with the release of the Panther Point chipset. According to some industry analysts, Intel was slow to integrate USB 3.0 into the chipset, thus slowing mainstream adoption. These delays may be due to problems in the CMOS manufacturing process, a focus to advance the Nehalem platform, a wait to mature all the 3.0 connections standards (USB 3.0, PCIe 3.0, SATA 3.0) before developing a new chipset, or a strategy by Intel to favor its new Thunderbolt interface. Apple, Inc. announced laptops with USB 3.0 ports on 11 June 2012, nearly four years after USB 3.0 was finalized.

AMD began supporting USB 3.0 with its Fusion Controller Hubs in 2011. Samsung Electronics announced support of USB 3.0 with its ARM-based Exynos 5 Dual platform intended for handheld devices.

== Issues ==
=== Speed and compatibility ===
Various early USB 3.0 implementations widely used the NEC/Renesas μD72020x family of host controllers, which are known to require a firmware update to function properly with some devices.

A factor affecting the speed of USB storage devices, which is more evident with USB 3.0 devices, but also noticeable with USB 2.0 ones, is that the USB Mass Storage Bulk-Only Transfer (BOT) protocol drivers are generally slower than the USB Attached SCSI protocol (UAS[P]) drivers.

On some old (2009–2010) Ibex Peak-based motherboards, the built-in USB 3.0 chipsets are connected by default via a 2.5 GT/s PCI Express lane of the PCH, which then did not provide full PCI Express 2.0 speed (5 GT/s), so it did not provide enough bandwidth even for a single USB 3.0 port. Early versions of such boards (e.g. the Gigabyte Technology P55A-UD4 or P55A-UD6) have a manual switch (in BIOS) that can connect the USB 3.0 chip to the processor (instead of the PCH), which did provide full-speed PCI Express 2.0 connectivity even then, but this meant using fewer PCI Express 2.0 lanes for the graphics card. However, newer boards (e.g. Gigabyte P55A-UD7 or the Asus P7P55D-E Premium) used a channel bonding technique (in the case of those boards provided by a PLX PEX8608 or PEX8613 PCI Express switch) that combines two PCI Express 2.5 GT/s lanes into a single PCI Express 5 GT/s lane among other features, thus obtaining the necessary bandwidth from the PCH.

=== Radio frequency interference ===
USB 3.0 devices and cables may interfere with wireless devices operating in the 2.4 GHz ISM band. This may result in a drop in throughput or complete loss of response with Bluetooth and Wi-Fi devices. When manufacturers were unable to resolve the interference issues in that time, some mobile devices, such as the Vivo Xplay 3S, had to drop support for USB 3.0 just before they shipped. Various strategies can be applied to mitigate the problem, ranging from simple solutions, such as increasing the distance of USB 3.0 devices from Wi-Fi and Bluetooth devices, to applying shielding and grounding around USB devices and USB hosts.

== Connectors ==
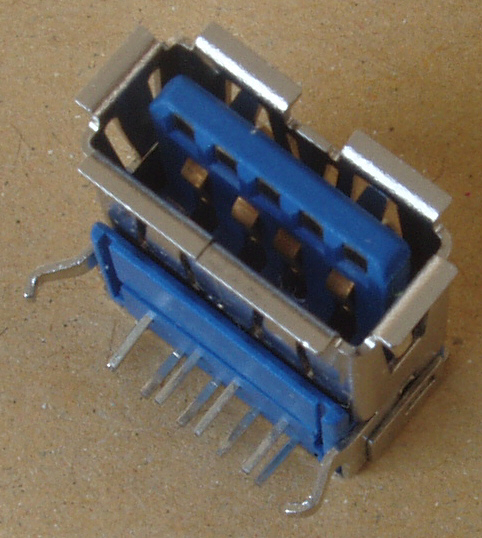
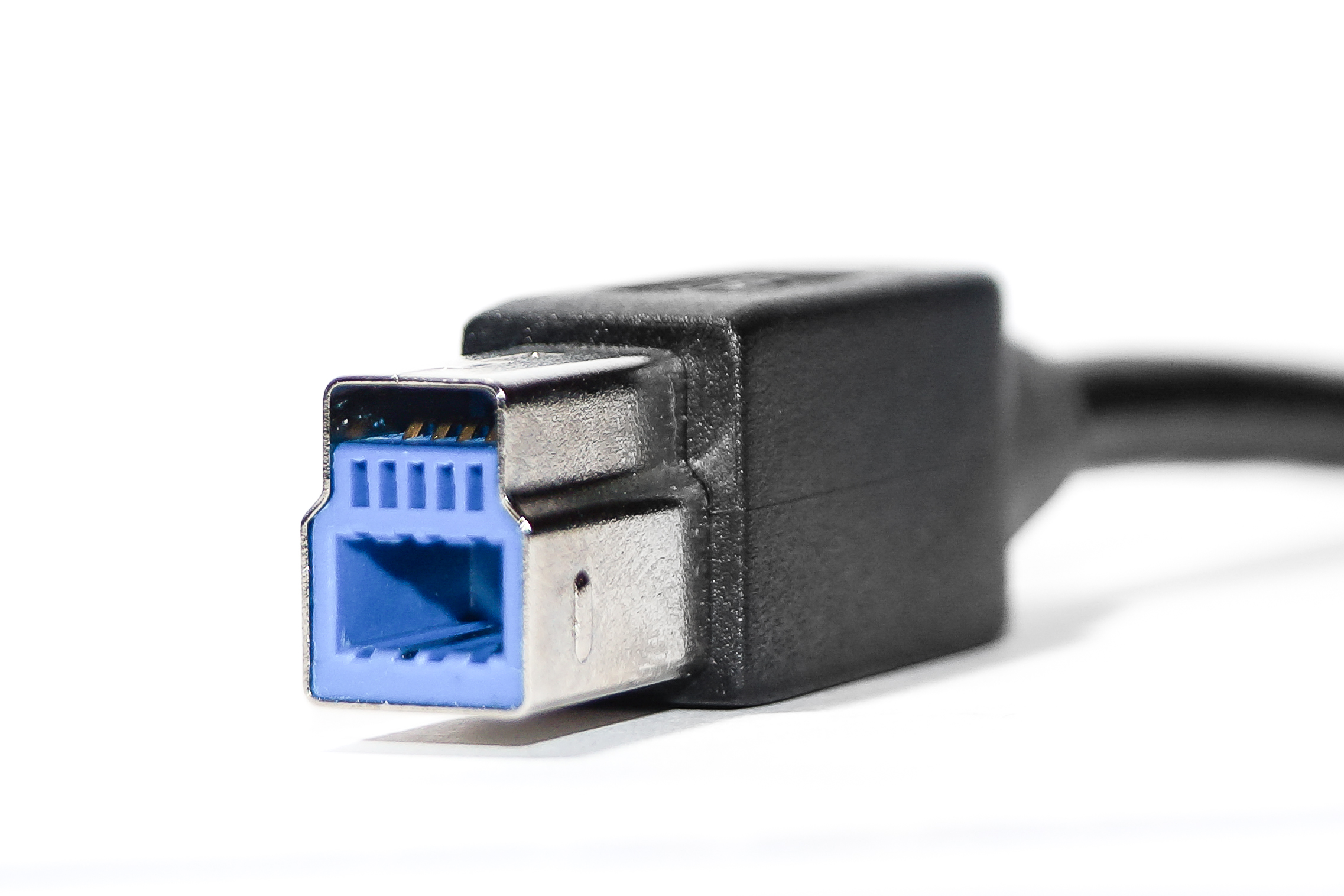
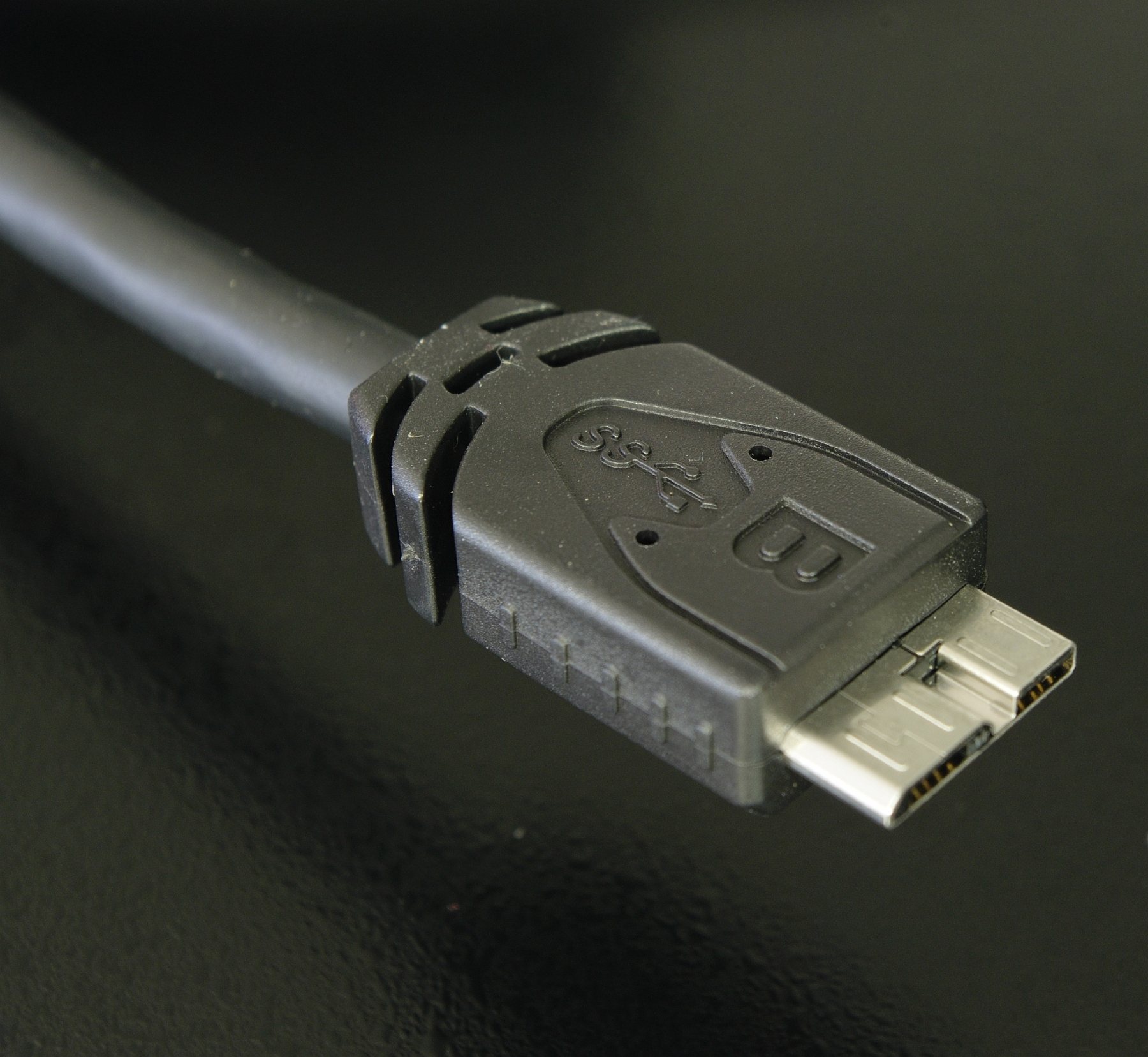
USB 3.0 Standard‑A receptacle (top, in the blue color Pantone 300 C), Standard‑B plug (middle), and Micro‑B plug (bottom)

A USB 3.0 Standard‑A receptacle accepts either a USB 3.0 Standard‑A plug or a USB 2.0 Standard‑A plug. Conversely, it is possible to plug a USB 3.0 Standard‑A plug into a USB 2.0 Standard‑A receptacle. This is a principle of backward compatibility. The Standard‑A plug is used for connecting to a computer port, at the host side.

A USB 3.0 Standard‑B receptacle accepts either a USB 3.0 Standard‑B plug or a USB 2.0 Standard‑B plug. Backward compatibility applies to connecting a USB 2.0 Standard‑B plug into a USB 3.0 Standard‑B receptacle. However, it is not possible to plug a USB 3.0 Standard‑B plug into a USB 2.0 Standard‑B receptacle, due to the physically larger connector. The Standard‑B plug is used at the device side.

Because USB 2.0 and USB 3.0 ports may coexist on the same machine and they look similar, the USB 3.0 specification recommends that the Standard‑A USB 3.0 receptacle have a blue insert (Pantone 300 C color). The same color-coding applies to the USB 3.0 Standard‑A plug.

USB 3.0 also introduced a new Micro‑B cable plug, which consists of a standard USB 1.x/2.0 Micro‑B cable plug, with an additional 5-pin plug "stacked" beside it. That way, the USB 3.0 Micro‑B host receptacle preserves its backward compatibility with the USB 1.x/2.0 Micro‑B cable plug, allowing devices with USB 3.0 Micro‑B ports to run at USB 2.0 speeds on USB 2.0 Micro‑B cables. However, it is not possible to plug a USB 3.0 Micro‑B plug into a USB 2.0 Micro‑B receptacle, due to the physically larger connector.

=== Pin assignments ===
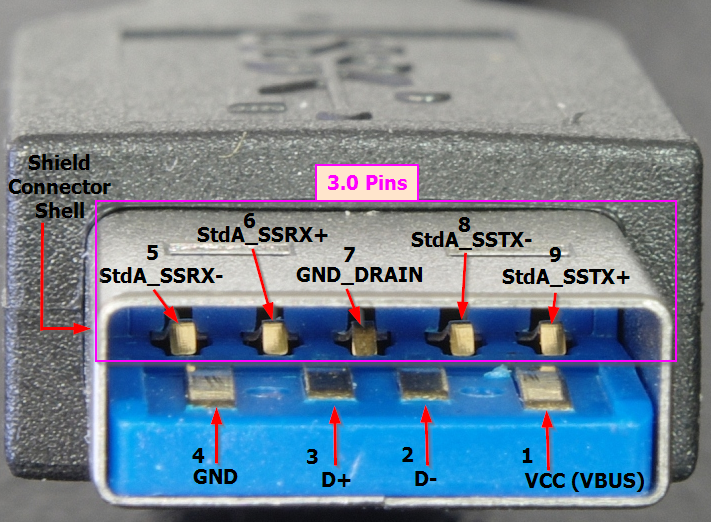
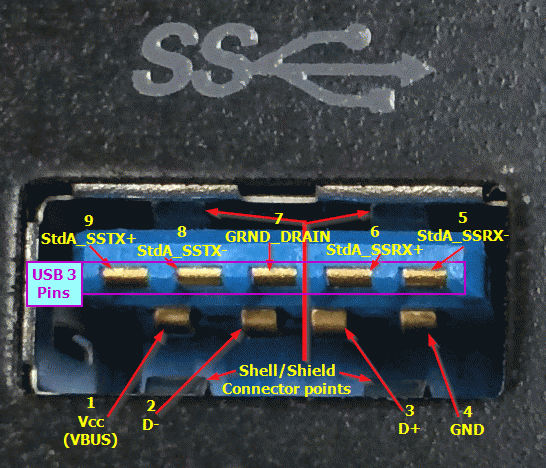
USB 3.0 Standard‑A plug (top) and receptacle (bottom), with annotated pins

The connector has the same physical configuration as its predecessor but with five more pins.

The VBUS, D−, D+, and GND pins are required for USB 2.0 communication. The five additional USB 3.0 pins are two differential pairs and one ground (GND_DRAIN). The two additional differential pairs are for SuperSpeed data transfer; they are used for full duplex SuperSpeed signaling. The GND_DRAIN pin is for drain wire termination and to control EMI and maintain signal integrity.

USB 3.0 connector pin assignments
Pin	Color	Signal name		Description
Pin	Color	A connector	B connector	Description
Shell	—N/a	Shield		Metal housing
1	Red	VBUS		Power
2	White	D−		USB 2.0 differential pair
3	Green	D+		USB 2.0 differential pair
4	Black	GND		Ground for power return
5	Blue	StdA_SSRX−	StdB_SSTX−	SuperSpeed receiver differential pair
6	Yellow	StdA_SSRX+	StdB_SSTX+	SuperSpeed receiver differential pair
7	—N/a	GND_DRAIN		Ground for signal return
8	Purple	StdA_SSTX−	StdB_SSRX−	SuperSpeed transmitter differential pair
9	Orange	StdA_SSTX+	StdB_SSRX+	SuperSpeed transmitter differential pair
The USB 3.0 Powered‑B connector has two additional pins for power and ground supplied to the device.
10	—N/a		DPWR	Power provided to device (Powered‑B only)
11	—N/a		DGND	Ground for DPWR return (Powered‑B only)

=== Backward compatibility ===
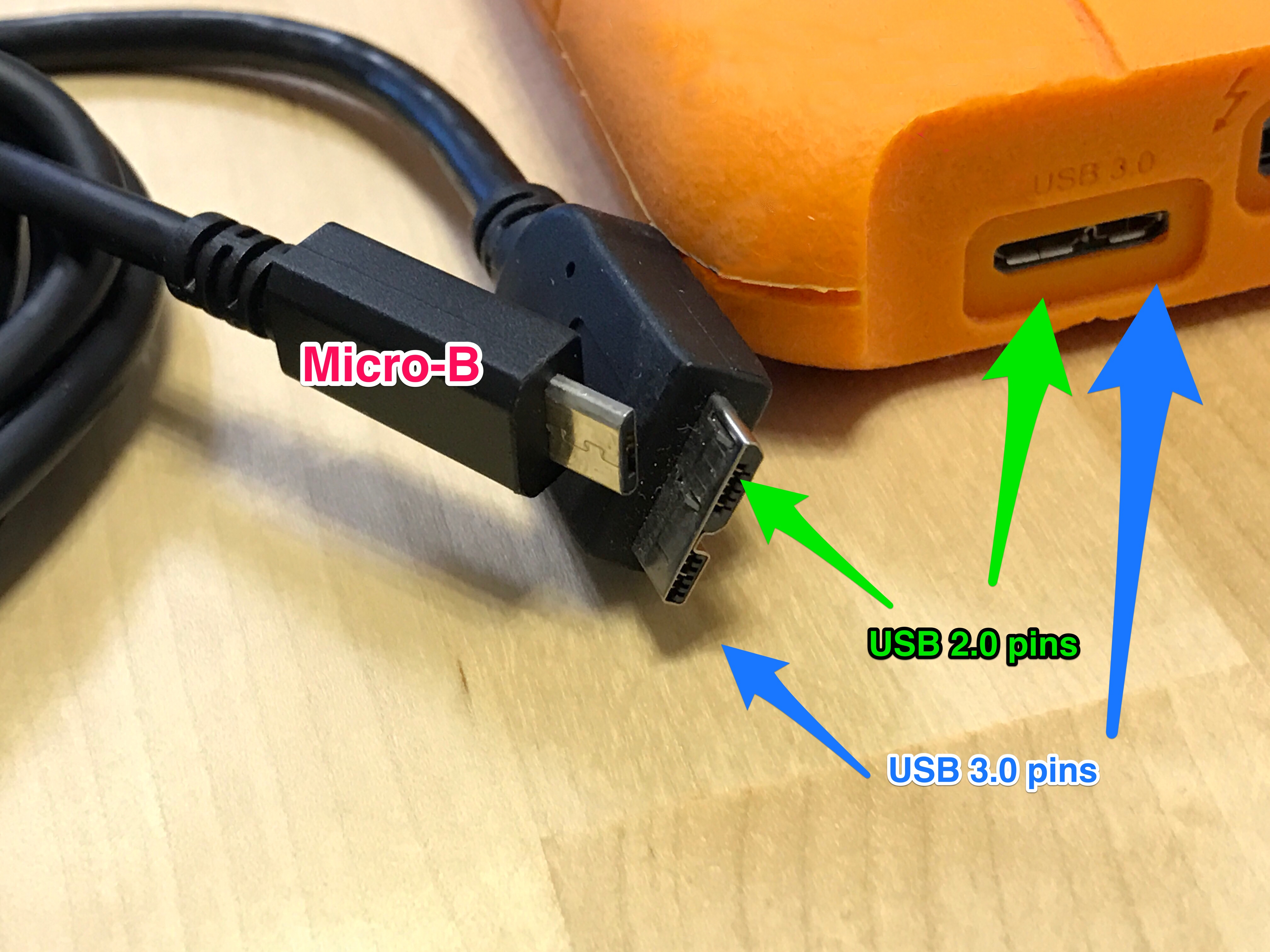
USB Micro‑B USB 2.0 vs USB Micro‑B SuperSpeed (USB 3.0)

USB 3.0 and USB 2.0 or earlier Type‑A plugs and receptacles are designed to interoperate.

USB 3.0 Type‑B receptacles, such as those found on peripheral devices, are larger than in USB 2.0 or earlier versions, and accept both the larger USB 3.0 Type‑B plug and the smaller USB 2.0 or earlier Type‑B plug. USB 3.0 Type‑B plugs are larger than USB 2.0 or earlier Type‑B plugs; therefore, USB 3.0 Type‑B plugs cannot be inserted into USB 2.0 or earlier Type‑B receptacles.

Micro USB 3.0 (Micro‑B) plug and receptacle are intended primarily for small portable devices such as smartphones, digital cameras and GPS devices. The Micro USB 3.0 receptacle is backward compatible with the Micro USB 2.0 plug.

A receptacle for eSATAp, which is an eSATA/USB combo, is designed to accept USB Type‑A plugs from USB 2.0 or earlier, so it also accepts USB 3.0 Type‑A plugs.

== USB 3.1 ==
A deprecated SuperSpeed+ USB 10Gbps packaging logo

USB 10Gbps port logo

In January 2013 the USB group announced plans to update USB 3.0 to 10 Gbit/s (1250 MB/s). The group created a new USB specification, USB 3.1, which was released on 31 July 2013, replacing the USB 3.0 standard. The USB 3.1 specification took over the existing USB 3.0's SuperSpeed USB transfer rate, now referred to as USB 3.1 Gen 1, and introduced a faster transfer rate called SuperSpeed USB 10 Gbit/s, corresponding to operation mode USB 3.1 Gen 2, putting it on par with a single first-generation Thunderbolt channel. The new mode's logo features a caption stylized as SUPERSPEED+; this refers to the updated SuperSpeedPlus protocol. The USB 3.1 Gen 2 mode also reduces line encoding overhead to 3% by changing the scheme to 128b/132b, with a raw data rate of 1,212 MB/s. The first USB 3.1 Gen 2 implementation demonstrated real-world transfer speeds of 7.2 Gbit/s.

The USB 3.1 specification includes the USB 2.0 specification while fully preserving its dedicated physical layer, architecture, and protocol in parallel. USB 3.1 specification defines the following operation modes:

- USB 3.1 Gen 1 – newly marketed as SuperSpeed or SS, 5 Gbit/s signaling rate over one lane using 8b/10b encoding (raw data rate: 500 MB/s); replaced USB 3.0.
- USB 3.1 Gen 2 – new, marketed as SuperSpeed+ or SS+, 10 Gbit/s signaling rate over one lane using 128b/132b encoding (raw data rate: 1212 MB/s).

The nominal data rate in bytes accounts for bit-encoding overhead. The physical SuperSpeed signaling bit rate is 5 Gbit/s. Because transmission of every byte takes 10 bit times, the raw data overhead is 20%, so the raw byte rate is 500 MB/s, not 625. Similarly, for Gen 2 link the encoding is 128b/132b, so transmission of 16 bytes physically takes 16.5 bytes, or 3% overhead. Therefore, the new raw byte-rate is 128/132 * 10 Gbit/s = 9.697 Gbit/s = 1212 MB/s. In reality, any operation mode has additional link management and protocol overhead, so the best-case achievable data rates for the Gen 2 operation mode are of roughly below 800 MB/s for reading bulk transfers only.

The re-specification of USB 3.0 as "USB 3.1 Gen 1" was misused by some manufacturers to advertise products with signaling rates of 5 Gbit/s as "USB 3.1" by omitting the defining generation.

== USB 3.2 ==
A deprecated SuperSpeed+ USB 20Gbps packaging logo

USB 20Gbps port logo

On 25 July 2017, a press release from the USB 3.0 Promoter Group detailed a pending update to the USB Type‑C specification, defining the doubling of bandwidth for existing USB‑C cables. Under the USB 3.2 specification, released 22 September 2017, existing SuperSpeed certified USB‑C 3.1 Gen 1 cables will be able to operate at 10 Gbit/s (up from 5 Gbit/s), and SuperSpeed+ certified USB‑C 3.1 Gen 2 cables will be able to operate at 20 Gbit/s (up from 10 Gbit/s). The increase in bandwidth is a result of multi-lane operation over existing wires that were intended for flip-flop capabilities of the USB‑C connector.

The USB 3.2 standard includes the USB 2.0 specification with four dedicated wires on the physical layer. The Enhanced SuperSpeed System encompasses both, but separated—and in parallel to the USB 2.0 implementation:

- SuperSpeed USB (based on SuperSpeed architecture and protocols):
  - USB 3.2 Gen 1×1 – newly marketed as SuperSpeed USB 5Gbps (replaces SuperSpeed or SS), 5 Gbit/s signaling rate over one lane using 8b/10b encoding (raw data rate: 500 MB/s); replaces USB 3.1 Gen 1, which replaced USB 3.0.
- SuperSpeedPlus USB (based on SuperSpeedPlus architecture and protocols):
  - USB 3.2 Gen 2×1 – newly marketed as SuperSpeed USB 10 Gbps (replaces SuperSpeed+ or SS+), 10 Gbit/s signaling rate over one lane using 128b/132b encoding (raw data rate: 1212 MB/s); replaces USB 3.1 Gen 2.
  - USB 3.2 Gen 1×2 – new, 10 Gbit/s signaling rate over two lanes using 8b/10b encoding (raw data rate: 1000 MB/s).
  - USB 3.2 Gen 2×2 – new, marketed as SuperSpeed USB 20 Gbps, 20 Gbit/s signaling rate over two lanes using 128b/132b encoding (raw data rate: 2424 MB/s).

As with the previous version, the same considerations around encoding and raw data rates apply. Although both Gen 1×2 and Gen 2(×1) signal at 10 Gbit/s, Gen 1×2 uses the older, less efficient 8b/10b line coding which results in a lower raw data rate compared with Gen 2(×1), though both using the newer SuperSpeedPlus protocol.

In May 2018, Synopsys demonstrated the first USB 3.2 Gen 2×2 operation mode, where a Windows PC was connected to a storage device, reaching an average data rate of 1600 MB/s for reading bulk transmissions, which is 66% of its raw throughput.

USB 3.2 is supported with the default Windows 10 USB drivers and in Linux kernels 4.18 and onwards.

In February 2019, USB-IF simplified the marketing guidelines by excluding Gen 1×2 mode and required the SuperSpeed trident logos to include maximum transfer speed.

Two-lane operation (USB 3.2 Gen 1×2, USB 3.2 Gen 2×2) is only possible with Full-Featured Type‑C connectors.

USB 3.2 specification operation modes
USB-IF recommended marketing name	Logo	USB 3.2 specification operation mode	Older operation mode names (first publication)	Dual lane	Encoding	Nominal signal rate	Raw data rate	Measured maximal rates (bulk transfers)	Supporting connectors
USB 5Gbps		USB 3.2 Gen 1×1	USB 3.0, USB 3.1 Gen 1 (USB 3.0)	No	8b/10b	5 Gbit/s	0.5 GB/s	≤ 200-460 MB/s	SS Standard-[A, B], SS Micro-[A, B, AB], C
USB 10Gbps		USB 3.2 Gen 2×1	USB 3.1 Gen 2 (USB 3.1)	No	128b/132b	10 Gbit/s	1.2 GB/s	≤ 0.8-1 GB/s	SS Standard-[A, B], SS Micro-[A, B, AB], C
—N/a		USB 3.2 Gen 1×2	— (USB 3.2)	Yes	8b/10b	10 Gbit/s	1 GB/s	≤ 0.7 GB/s	C
USB 20Gbps		USB 3.2 Gen 2×2	— (USB 3.2)	Yes	128b/132b	20 Gbit/s	2.4 GB/s	≤ 1.6-2 GB/s	C

== See also ==
- Computer bus – Data transfer channel connecting parts of a computer
- Extensible Host Controller Interface (xHCI) – Computer interface specification
- List of device bit rates § Peripheral
- Mobile High-Definition Link – Audio and video interface
- USB hardware § Host and device interface receptacles
