= Open spectrum =

Open spectrum (also known as free spectrum) is a movement to get the Federal Communications Commission to provide more unlicensed radio-frequency spectrum that is available for use by all. Proponents of the "commons model" of open spectrum advocate a future where all the spectrum is shared, and in which people use Internet protocols to communicate with each other, and smart devices, which would find the most effective energy level, frequency, and mechanism. Previous government-imposed limits on who can have stations and who cannot would be removed, and everyone would be given equal opportunity to use the airwaves for their own radio station, television station, or even broadcast their own website. A notable advocate for Open Spectrum is Lawrence Lessig.

National governments currently allocate bands of spectrum (sometimes based on guidelines from the ITU) for use by anyone so long as they respect certain technical limits, most notably, a limit on total transmission power. Unlicensed spectrum is decentralized: there are no license payments or central control for users. However, sharing spectrum between unlicensed equipment requires that mitigation techniques (e.g.: power limitation, duty cycle, dynamic frequency selection) are imposed to ensure that these devices operate without interference.

Traditional users of unlicensed spectrum include cordless telephones, and baby monitors. A collection of new technologies are taking advantage of unlicensed spectrum including Wi-Fi, Ultra Wideband, spread spectrum, software-defined radio, cognitive radio, and mesh networks.

== Radio astronomy needs ==
Astronomers use many radio telescopes to look up at objects such as pulsars in our own Galaxy and at distant radio galaxies up to about half the distance of the observable sphere of our Universe. The use of radio frequencies for communication creates pollution from the point of view of astronomers, at best, creating noise or, at worst, totally blinding the astronomical community for certain types of observations of very faint objects. As more and more frequencies are used for communication, astronomical observations are getting more and more difficult.

Negotiations to defend the parts of the spectrum most useful for observing the Universe are mostly carried out by the international astronomical community, as a grassroots community effort, coordinated in the Scientific Committee on Frequency Allocations for Radio Astronomy and Space Science.

== See also ==
- Media consolidation
- Media democracy
- Pirate Radio
- Spectrum commons theory
