= USB Implementers Forum =

Organization that supports the USB standard

- Abbreviation: USB-IF
- Founded: 5 December 1995; 30 years ago
- Tax ID no.: 93-1296452
- Legal status: 501(c)(6) professional association
- Headquarters: Beaverton, Oregon, U.S.
- Coordinates: 45.492060°N 122.832878°W
- President, Chief Operating Officer: Jeff Ravencraft
- Revenue: $4,789,113 (2015)
- Expenses: $4,579,090 (2015)
- Employees: 0 (2015)
- Volunteers: 57 (2015)
- Website: www.usb.org/about

USB Implementers Forum, Inc. (USB-IF) is a nonprofit organization created to promote and maintain USB (Universal Serial Bus), a set of specifications and transmission procedures for a type of cable connection that has since become used widely for electronic equipment. Its main activities are currently the promotion and marketing of USB4, USB 3.2, USB Power Delivery, USB Type-C, and the maintenance of standards and specifications for the related devices, as well as a compliance program.

The USB-IF was initiated on 5 December 1995, by the group of companies that was developing USB, which was made available first during 1996. The founding companies of USB-IF were Compaq, Digital Equipment Corporation, IBM, Intel, Microsoft, NEC and Nortel. Notable current members include HP, NEC, Microsoft, Apple Inc., Intel, and Broadcom.

The working committees within USB-IF are:

- Device Working Group;
- Compliance Committee;
- Marketing Committee.

The USB-IF web caters to developers who may register freely for the developer web-forums and access documentation. To be part of a working group, however, a person has to work for a member company or register as a member. The developer forums regulate the development of the USB connector, of other USB hardware, and of USB software; they are not end-user forums.

In 2014, the USB-IF announced the availability of USB Type-C designs. USB-C connectors were introduced with transfer data with rates as much as 10 Gbit/s and provides as much as 100 watts of power.

In 2015, the seven-person board of directors, with Jeff Ravencraft as USB-IF president and chief operating officer, consisted of representatives of Apple Inc., HP Inc., Intel Corporation, Microsoft Corporation, Renesas Electronics, STMicroelectronics, and Texas Instruments.

In 2020, USB-IF announced updated USB Device Class Definition for MIDI Devices, Version 2.0, for MIDI 2.0 devices.

== Vendor ID issuance ==
A vendor identification is necessary for obtaining a certification of compliance from the USB-IF. The USB-IF is responsible for issuing USB vendor identification numbers to product manufacturers. The cost for issuing this number is US$6,000 per year. Additionally, the use of a trademarked USB logo to identify certified devices requires a license fee of US$3,500 for a 2-year term. Some microcontroller manufacturers offer a free or low cost sublicense of their vendor ID for development/testing and limited production (generally less than 10,000 units). Vendors offering this free service include:

- Dream S.A.S.
- Energy Micro
- FTDI
- Luminary Micro
- Microchip
- NXP
- Silicon Labs
- STMicroelectronics
- Texas Instruments

Alternatively, many members of the open source community promote the use of USB VID 0xF055 (which looks when written like "FOSS") for open-source hardware projects. Although this VID is not registered to any company (as of October 2015), the USB-IF have not released any confirmation about reserving it for this particular purpose.

== See also ==
- MTP (Media Transfer Protocol)
- Personal Computer Memory Card International Association (PCMCIA)
- UEFI Forum
