= Time-hopping =

Communications signal technique

Time-hopping (TH) is a communications signal technique which can be used to achieve anti-jamming (AJ) or low-probability-of-intercept (LPI). It can also refer to pulse-position modulation, which in its simplest form employs 2^{k} discrete pulses (referring to the unique positions of the pulse within the transmission window) to transmit k bit(s) per pulse.

== Details ==
To achieve LPI, the transmission time is changed randomly by varying the period and duty cycle of the pulse (carrier) using a pseudo-random sequence. The transmitted signal will then have intermittent start and stop times. Although often used to form hybrid spread-spectrum (SS) systems, TH is strictly speaking a non-SS technique. Spreading of the spectrum is caused by other factors associated with TH, such as using pulses with low duty cycle having a wide frequency response. An example of hybrid SS is TH-FHSS or hybrid TDMA (time division multiple access).

== See also ==
- Spread spectrum
- Frequency-hopping spread spectrum
- Direct-sequence spread spectrum
- Ultra-wideband
