= USB4 =

Technical standard in computing

- Type: USB

Production history
- Designer: USB Promoter Group
- Designed: 29 August 2019; 7 years ago
- Superseded: USB 3.2

General specifications
- Daisy chain: No
- Audio signal: DisplayPort
- Video signal: DisplayPort
- Pins: 24
- Connector: USB-C

Electrical
- Max. voltage: 48 V (PD 3.1)
- Max. current: 5 A (PD)

Data
- Data signal: USB or PCIe
- Bitrate: 20 Gbit/s; 40 Gbit/s; 80 Gbit/s; 120/40 Gbit/s asymmetric

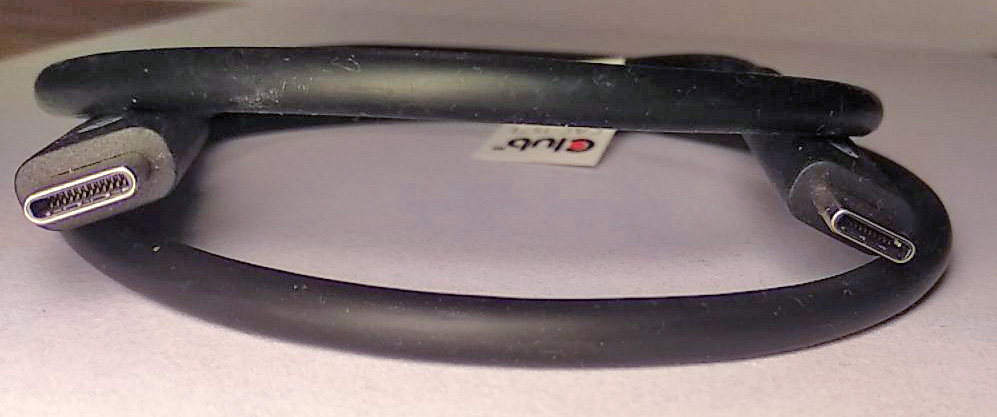
USB 40Gbps, 100 W cable

Universal Serial Bus 4 (USB4), sometimes erroneously referred to as USB 4.0, is the most recent technical specification of the USB (Universal Serial Bus) data communication standard. The USB Implementers Forum announced USB4 in 2019.

USB4 enables multiple devices to dynamically share a single high-speed data link. USB4 defines signaling rates of 20 Gbit/s, 40 Gbit/s and 80 Gbit/s. USB4 is only defined for USB-C connectors, and its Type-C specification regulates the connector, cables, and basic power delivery features across all uses of USB-C cables, enhanced with the USB Power Delivery specification.

The USB4 standard mandates "functionality backward compatibility" to USB 3.x and dedicated backward compatibility with USB 2.0. The dynamic sharing of bandwidth of a USB4 connection is achieved by encapsulating multiple virtual connections ("tunnels") of other protocols, such as USB 3.x, HDMI, DisplayPort and PCI Express.

USB4 is based on the Thunderbolt 3 protocol. However, it is different enough that backward compatibility to Thunderbolt 3 is optional for many device types.

== History ==
Prior to USB4, Thunderbolt provided a way to dynamically share bandwidth between multiple DisplayPort and PCIe connections over a single cable. Thunderbolt originally used the Mini DisplayPort connector and was only backward compatible to DisplayPort connections and did not support power transfer.

The introduction of the USB Type-C connector in 2014 provided a connector that could support USB data connectivity and power transfer as well as DP connections. It also allowed the static sharing of bandwidth between DP and USB connections over the same cable.

Thunderbolt 3 switched over to using the new Type-C connector and also added backward compatibility for USB connections and power transfer features.

=== USB4 Version 1.0 ===
USB 40Gbps port logo

USB4 was announced in March 2019 by the USB Promoter Group. The version 1.0 of the USB4 specification, released 29 August 2019, is titled "Universal Serial Bus 4 (USB4™)". Several news reports before the release of that version sometimes use the wrong terminology "USB 4.0" and "USB 4".

In the announcement press release, the USB Promoter Group mentions that USB4 is "based on the Thunderbolt™ protocol specification recently contributed by Intel Corporation". Goals stated in the USB4 specification are increasing bandwidth, helping to converge the USB-C connector ecosystem, and "minimize end-user confusion". Some of the key areas to achieve this are using a single USB-C connector type, to offer display and data transfer features, while retaining "compatibility with existing and Thunderbolt products".

Version 1.0 defined 20 Gbit/s and 40 Gbit/s connections, the required support of USB 2.0 and USB 3.x connections at up to 10 Gbit/s with support for tunneling connections according to the PCIe 4.0, USB 3.2, and DisplayPort 1.4a specifications. Optional backward compatibility to Thunderbolt 3 as well as Host-to-Host networking were also defined. Compared to Thunderbolt 3, USB4 changed the raw bit rates slightly to bring them in line with other USB specifications, where the nominal bit rate matches the raw bit rate. USB4 also added support for USB3 tunnels and use of the USB2 wires for improved backward compatibility with previous USB standards and to allow for simpler USB4 devices without support for PCIe. USB4 also added support for hub topologies compared to Thunderbolt's previous restriction to daisy-chaining topology.

In July 2020 Intel announced Thunderbolt 4 as an implementation of USB4 40 Gbit/s with additional requirements, such as mandatory backward compatibility to Thunderbolt 3 and requirement for smaller notebooks to support being charged over Thunderbolt 4 ports. Publications such as AnandTech described Thunderbolt 4 as a "superset of TB3 and USB4" and "able to accept TB4, TB3, USB4, and USB 3/2/1 connections". Intel itself describes Thunderbolt 4 as "delivering increased minimum performance requirements, expanded capabilities and USB4 specification compliance" and as building "on the innovation of Thunderbolt 3".

=== USB4 Version 2.0 ===
USB 80Gbps port logo

On 18 October 2022 the USB Promoter Group released the USB4 Version 2.0 specification.

It added a new transmission speed that allows 80 Gbit/s symmetric connections or asymmetric connections supporting 120 Gbit/s in one direction and 40 Gbit/s in the other. The new PAM3 encoding scheme enables this over existing, passive USB 40Gbps cables. Active cables are not forward compatible in the same way, instead a new speed grade of active cables was added. It also upgraded the support of DP tunnels to DP 2.1, allowing the tunneling of DP connections with up to 80 Gbit/s (UHBR20). It also added a replacement of the previous tunneling of classic USB 3.2 connection speeds with "USB3 Gen T tunneling", which can exceed 20 Gbit/s and also removed PCIe overhead limitations.

Around the release of the new USB4 2.0 specification, USB-IF also mandated new logos and marketing names to simplify representing the maximum supported bit rates and wattages to consumers.

In September 2023, Intel announced the launch of Thunderbolt 5 as an implementation of USB4, using the new abilities of 80 Gbit/s connections and updated DP support Intel's own press release describes it as "built on industry standards – including USB4 V2".

== Functionality of USB4 ports ==
USB4 ports offer multiple different connection types. Some of them can coexist and work independently or in parallel with each other. This is further complicated, by USB4 connections themselves only being a container for other connections. Some connection standards are possible, both directly from the port as well as a contained within a USB4 connection. It is even possible for the functionality provided natively and within a USB4 connection to differ.

This section describes the possible non-USB4 connections, that mostly exist for backwards compatibility. For the USB4 connection and its contents refer to § USB4 protocol.

The USB4 specification speaks of downstream facing ports (DFP) and upstream facing ports (UFP) rather than host and peripheral ports. Downstream facing ports includes host ports as well as any "outputs" of a USB4 hub, while upstream facing ports include anything that is connectable to a downstream facing port, like the ports of peripherals or the "input" port of a USB4 hub.

Any USB4 DFP port is required to also implement USB 2.0, USB 3.2 and DP Alternative Mode support, each according to their own specifications. As such, a USB4 DFP is backward compatible to all previous USB standards and DP output.

=== USB 2.0 DFP features ===
USB 2.0 defines 3 different bit rates (Low-, Full-, High-Speed), all are required to be supported. USB 2.0 abilities use separate wires and pins on the Type-C connector that are not used by USB 3.2 or USB4 or most other Alt modes.

=== USB 3.x DFP features ===
USB 3.2, the current version, defines 3 different bit rates 5 Gbit/s, 10 Gbit/s and 20 Gbit/s. While the USB 3.2 specification has been referenced by USB4 from the start, only the two lower speeds (5 Gbit/s, 10 Gbit/s) are mandatory for USB4 DFPs to support. As with any previous USB 3.x DFP, the USB 2.0 connection remains available in parallel to it.

=== DP Alt Mode DFP features ===
The USB4 specifications make no reference to a minimum speed or features for its DP Alternative Mode functionality, but Thunderbolt 3 does. In practice, Intel's family of TB 3 controllers requires at least DisplayPort 1.2 at HBR2 speeds to support 4K60 output, but is also available with up to HBR3 speeds according to the DisplayPort 1.4a specification. DP Alt Mode can always coexist with USB 2.0 connections. And it can be used in a halved mode, where half of the other high speed wires remain available for 5 or 10 Gbit/s USB 3.x connections.

=== Thunderbolt 3 Alt Mode DFP/UFP features ===
While a very common feature, it is optional for most USB4 ports to support the TB3 connections (at 20 or 40 Gbit/s). While those TB3 connections are technically an Alt Mode, similar to DP Alt mode, the principles of it are closest to USB4 connections. See Thunderbolt 3 Compatibility for more details. It is possible for USB4 devices to support TB3 connections (to other USB4 devices or to TB3 peripherals), but not support being recognized by TB3 hosts.

=== Power transfer features for DFP ===
The USB4 specification makes no explicit demands on power output. It outsources all requirements in terms of power to the Type-C specification that underpins all USB, DP and other standards that use the USB-C connector. This requires a USB4 DFP to supply at least 7.5W Type-C current. No power consumption features (e.g., charging of a notebook) are required, but can be supported following the USB PD specification, as well as supplying considerably more power. The USB PD protocol must always have support for exchanging data according to the protocol. This is separate from any functionality of PD to negotiate actual power delivery other than 5V or >15W.

=== USB4 hubs & docks ===
USB4 hubs and docks are defined as their own category of USB4 devices that include further requirements. For example, a USB4 hub must also serve as a classic USB 3.2 hub with DP Alternative Mode passthrough with hosts that do not support USB4 connections. They are required to support Thunderbolt 3 connections. See USB4 capabilities by device type for more details.

== USB4 protocol ==
Every USB4 port must support the USB4 protocol, which is a distinct standard to establish USB4 links between USB4 devices that exists in parallel to previous USB protocols. Unlike USB 2.0 and USB 3.x, it does not provide a way to transfer data directly, it is rather a mere vessel that can contain multiple virtual connections ("tunnels").

Other specifications are referenced to define the contents and internal functionality of a tunnel. USB4 defines the following tunnel types:

- USB3 connections
- DisplayPort connections
- PCIe connections
- Ethernet/network connections according to the included USB4Net and Cross-Domain specifications

=== General principles of USB4 ===
USB4 forms a tree-like topology of USB4 routers, where each USB4 device includes a USB4 router to participate in this network. A tunnel can be end-to-end, where the route through the entire network of routers is preconfigured. But tunnels can also be single-hop, where it exists only for a single USB4 link (i.e., between 2 routers). In this case, the tunnel will be "unpacked" by the recipient and will use some other means specific to the tunnel type to identify where data needs to be sent next. If the next hop is another USB4 router, data will be ingested again into the next single-hop tunnel until it exits the USB4 network.

Accordingly, single-hop tunnels require specific support in each USB4 router, just to support passing them through to further USB4 routers. However, end-to-end tunnels require support of a USB4 router only when the data is ingested into the tunnel and at the target, to the point where the tunnel ends.

Note: USB 2.0 is not part of any tunnel. That functionality is provided by maintaining a physically and logically separate USB 2.0 connection in parallel to a USB4 connection over the dedicated wires, just as it was handled with USB 3.x and its backward compatibility to USB 2.0.

==== Protocol input/output adapters ====
A Protocol Input Adapter will ingest a connection according to whatever protocol it is based on and convert the contents into a USB4 tunnel. Protocol Output Adapters do the reverse. They extract a tunnel from the USB4 network and if needed recreate a regular connection from the tunnel contents.

The conversion into a tunnel typically entails removing any Phy/Electrical layer and encoding of the underlying connection standard and potentially losslessly compresses the contents; for example, by leaving out empty filler data. A USB4 tunnel itself is virtual and doesn't need to conform to any fixed bandwidth or other limitations that stem from the Phy/Electrical layer of the underlying connection standard. But since most tunnel types will eventually be converted back to a regular, physical connection again, most of those physical limitations, like max. bandwidth, are still likely to apply in the end.

=== USB3 Gen X tunneling ===
This is a single-hop tunnel that essentially can transport any Enhanced SuperSpeed connection according to the USB 3.2 specification. USB3 Gen X follows the Enhanced SuperSpeed Hub topology, where every USB4 router with more than one USB3 endpoint must include a USB3 hub as well. It is the default way USB3 connections through USB4 are made. Supporting it at 10 Gbit/s is mandatory on every USB4 DFP. The minimum supported speed for the USB3 connection being tunneled is 10 Gbit/s as every USB4 device already has to support this speed and USB3 hubs handle converting this to 5 Gbit/s devices that may be connected.

This means that a USB4 hub will share a single upstream USB3 connection and distribute its bandwidth across all its downstream facing ports that make use of USB3 connections.

=== USB3 Gen T tunneling ===
This is an optional alternative to USB3 Gen X tunneling that was introduced in USB4 Version 2.0. It is an end-to-end variant of USB3 Gen X tunnel.

Through this, it eschews the need for USB3 hubs in every USB4 router that can and will limit the throughput. It allows multiple separate USB3 Gen T tunnels even over shared links. Since it is an end-to-end tunnel, every USB4 hub will support passing it through. USB3 Gen T is intended as exclusively virtual, there exists no physical equivalent for it. Thus, it can only be used inside of a USB4 controller. This allows it to leave the limitations to 10 or 20 Gbit/s connections of USB 3.2 behind, while reusing most of the other parts of the Enhanced SuperSpeed protocol.

No known USB4 controller implements support for Gen T tunneling to date (August 2024).

=== DP tunneling ===
DisplayPort is also tunneled as end-to-end connection. There can be multiple independent DP tunnels, but each will be delivered to a single protocol output adapter (at which point DisplayPort MST might be used to further split each connection).

USB4 Version 1.0 only defines how to tunnel DP connections according to the DisplayPort 1.4a specification (up to HBR3 speeds). USB4 Version 2.0 updates this support to the full DisplayPort 2.1 specification (up to UHBR20 speeds). Notably, the USB4 specification explicitly carves out needing to support the UHBR13.5 DP speed, even if UHBR20 is supported. The DP specification is not public. It is unknown if it makes similar carve-outs.

DP tunneling has great understanding of the contents of DP connections, and will efficiently skip/transmit any filler data, reducing the actually utilized bandwidth of a DP tunnel. But since DP connections have real-time requirements, bandwidth must be reserved for them. USB4 mandates that in absence of any other information, the maximum possible bandwidth for the particular DP connection (DP lanes and speed) must be reserved. This reservation only applies to other real-time tunnels though. Reserved, but unused bandwidth can be used by non-real-time tunnels such as PCIe or USB3, but the reservation may still block other DP tunnels from being established.

=== PCIe tunneling ===
Similar to USB3 Gen X tunneling, PCIe tunneling uses single-hop tunnels, requiring PCIe switches in every USB4 router that supports PCIe tunneling. USB4 has, from the start, referenced the PCI Express Specification Revision 4 and with USB4 Version 2.0 added references to PCI Express Specification Revision 5.0.

PCIe tunneling has had a significant limitation in USB4 Version 1.0 and also Thunderbolt 3: PCIe has a variable Maximum Payload Size, which applies end-to-end to a transmission. If any one component or PCIe Switch has a limited MPS, all packets passing through must be limited accordingly. Because USB4 uses a payload of up to 256 Byte per USB4 packet and a PCIe tunnel packet contains further PCIe headers and meta data, the MPS for PCIe tunnels was limited to 128 Byte. This limitation can reduce the efficiency of the PCIe connection greatly for all devices and systems that would otherwise support 256 Byte or even larger MPS.

USB4 Version 2.0 removes this bottleneck (mandatory for all implementers), by defining how a larger PCIe packet can be split across multiple USB4 packets. Support for this new feature requires every USB4 component / controller involved in the PCIe tunnel to implement USB4 Version 2.0.

== USB4 signaling modes ==
Signaling refers to the lowest layer of the OSI Model, also called physical layer or phy. USB4 connections can be expressed with consumer facing names that are also the basis for the official logos used on packaging and products. These are the USB 20Gbps, USB 40Gbps, USB 80Gbps labels and they do not explicitly indicate how the connection is achieved on the physical layer.

There are also more technical names based on the implementation and use of the USB-C cables. These usually consist of a speed per wire-pair expressed as Gen 1/2/3/4 (5 Gbit/s, 10 Gbit/s, 20 Gbit/s, 40 Gbit/s respectively) and some further information on how many wire-pairs are used in which combination.

USB commonly defines a "Lane" as a (bidirectional) connection, which for all recent transmission modes consists of one sending and one receiving wire-pair. The "Gen AxB" notation refers to B Lanes of operation mode A. Since Gen 4 modes also introduced asymmetric connections with uneven numbers of wire-pairs dedicated to sending and receiving, the Lane-notation is no longer applicable.

The USB 3.x family has had the same technical notation retroactively added in the USB 3.1 and USB 3.2 specification versions. Though this shows common principles and the same generations refer to the same nominal speeds, "Gen A" does not have the same exact meaning in both USB 3.x and USB4 specifications. The overlap in naming mainly becomes relevant for cables as shown in Cable Compatibility, which is regulated by the Type-C specification shared across all users of Type-C connector.

Comparison of signaling modes
USB standard	Signaling mode name (Note: Names according to the newest specifications.)	Introduced in	Encoding	Wire-pairs sending+receiving	Signalling bit rate (Gbit/s)		Raw data rate (Note: Raw data rate for one direction with only encoding overhead removed, but still neglecting processing overhead (up to a third).) (Gbit/s)	USB-IF current marketing name	Logo
USB standard	Signaling mode name	Introduced in	Encoding	Wire-pairs sending+receiving	per wire-pair	total (per direction)	Raw data rate (Gbit/s)	USB-IF current marketing name	Logo
USB 2.0	High-Speed	USB 2.0	NRZI with bit stuffing	1 (shared)	0.480 (half-duplex)	0.480 (half-duplex)	?	Hi-Speed USB	
USB 3.2	Gen 1×1	USB 3.0	8b/10b	1+1	5	5	4	USB 5Gbps	
USB 3.2	Gen 2×1 (Note: USB4 Gen 2 is different from USB 3.2 Gen 2. They both signify the same signalling rate of 10 Gbit/s, but use different encoding and differ on the electrical layer. They also have different requirements for signal quality.)	USB 3.1	128b/132b	1+1	10	10	~9.7	USB 10Gbps	
USB 3.2	Gen 1×2	USB 3.2	8b/10b	2+2	5	10	8	USB 10Gbps	
USB 3.2	Gen 2×2	USB 3.2	128b/132b	2+2	10	20	~19.39	USB 20Gbps	
USB4	Gen 2×1	USB4	64b/66b (Note: USB4 Gen 2 & 3 can use optional Reed–Solomon forward error correction (RS FEC). In this mode, 12 × 16 B (128 bit) symbols are assembled together with 2 B (12 bit + 4 bit reserved) synchronisation bits indicating the respective symbol types and 4 B of RS FEC to allow to correct up to 1 B of errors anywhere in the total 198 B block.)	1+1	10	10	~9.697	(transient/fallback) (Note: USB4 is required to support dual-lane modes, but it uses single-lane operations during initialization of a dual-lane link; single-lane link can also be used as a fallback mode in case of a lane bonding error.)	
USB4	Gen 2×2	USB4	64b/66b	2+2	10	20	~19.39	USB 20Gbps	
USB4	Gen 3×1	USB4	128b/132b	1+1	20	20	~19.39	(transient/fallback)	
USB4	Gen 3×2	USB4	128b/132b	2+2	20	40	~38.79	USB 40Gbps	
USB4	Gen 4 symmetric	USB4 v2.0	PAM-3 11b/7t	2+2	~40.58 (Note: Per spec, lines run at 25.6 GBaud. One symbol contains 1 trit of information. Encoding transforms each group of 11 bits into 7 trits. 7 trits give 2187 different values or $log_2 3 \approx 1.585$ bits/trit. USB4 Version 2.0 Specification 2023, p84, sec. 3.2)	~81.15	~80.46	USB 80Gbps	
USB4	Gen 4 asymmetric 3:1	USB4 v2.0	PAM-3 11b/7t	3+1	~40.58	3×: ~121.725; 1×: ~40.58	3×: ~120.69; 1×: ~40.23	—N/a (Note: Optional features of USB 80Gbps connections and devices.)	
USB4	Gen 4 asymmetric 1:3	USB4 v2.0	PAM-3 11b/7t	1+3	~40.58	3×: ~121.725; 1×: ~40.58	3×: ~120.69; 1×: ~40.23	—N/a	
—N/a	TB3 Gen 2×2	—N/a	64b/66b	2+2	10.3125	20.625	20	—N/a	
—N/a	TB3 Gen 3×2	—N/a	128b/132b	2+2	20.625	41.25	40	—N/a	

Thunderbolt 3 Gen 2 and Gen 3 and the USB4 Gen 2 and Gen 3 modes use very similar signaling. However, Thunderbolt 3 runs at slightly higher speeds, called legacy speeds, compared to rounded speeds of USB4. It is driven slightly faster at 10.3125 Gbit/s (for Gen 2) and 20.625 Gbit/s (for Gen 3), as required by Thunderbolt specifications.

USB4 Gen 4 is normally referred to as a speed of "40 Gbps" or 40 Gbit/s, with the full connections based on it being referred to as 80, 120/40, 40/120 Gbit/s. But since the actual signaling is no longer binary, the actual raw bit rates no longer match those numbers exactly.

== USB4 capabilities by device type ==
=== USB4 hub ===
A USB4 hub is defined by having 1 USB4 UFP and one or more USB4 DFP.

=== USB4-based dock ===
A USB4-based dock is defined as a USB4 hub that also has more specialized outputs like HDMI or DP, but still keeping some USB4 DFP.

=== USB4 peripheral device ===
A USB4 peripheral device is defined by not having any USB4 DFP. This means devices that are colloquially called "USB-C hubs" may use USB4 to support the dynamic bandwidth sharing or higher bandwidths of USB4. But they are not USB4 hubs if they do not have any USB4 DFP. Not having any USB4 DFP allows the peripheral to only support exactly those USB4 features that it has uses for, potentially simplifying its implementation considerably.

USB4 feature support
Feature		Host	Hub (dock)	Peripheral device
Type		Host	Hub (dock)	Peripheral device
USB4 connection	"20 Gbps" (Gen 2×2)	Yes	Yes	Yes
USB4 connection	"40 Gbps" (Gen 3×2)	Optional	Yes	Optional
USB4 connection	"80 Gbps" (Gen 4 symm.)	Optional	Optional	Optional
USB4 connection	"120/40 Gbps" (Gen 4 3:1)	Optional	Optional (Note: Even for "USB 80Gbps" USB4 hubs, supporting asymmetric connections (in either direction) is optional, but 80 Gbit/s support is a prerequisite for any asymmetric support.)	Optional
USB4 connection	"40/120 Gbps" (Gen 4 1:3)	Optional	Optional	Optional
Tunneled	USB3 "10 Gbps" (Gen 2×1)	Yes	Yes	Optional
Tunneled	USB3 "20 Gbps" (Gen 2×2)	Optional	Optional	Optional
Tunneled	USB3 Gen T (variable bandwidth) (Note: USB3 Gen T tunneling has defined bandwidth options. They match the total USB4 speed numbers 10,20,40,80 and even asymmetric 40/120,120/40 connections. USB4 v2 specification, p536, tab.9-19)	Optional	Optional	Optional
Tunneled	DisplayPort	Yes	Yes	Optional
Tunneled	PCI Express	Optional (Note: Windows HLK requires any USB4 port support PCIe tunneling and TB3 compatibility. No minimum PCIe bandwidth requirements.)	Yes	Optional
Tunneled	Host-to-host communications/ USB4 networking	Yes	Yes	—N/a
Native	USB3 "5 Gbps" (Gen 1×1)	Yes	Yes	Optional
Native	USB3 "10 Gbps" (Gen 2×1)	Yes	Yes	Optional
Native	USB3 "20 Gbps" (Gen 2×2)	Optional	Optional	Optional
Native	USB 2.0 (Low-, Full-, High-Speed) (Note: As with USB3, USB2 connection runs on separate wires from main (USB3/USB4) connection. Tunneling is not required as it runs in parallel on the cable.)	Yes	Yes	Optional
Native	DisplayPort Alternate Mode (Note: The USB4 specification makes no requirements on the minimum speed or capabilities of any DP output.)	Yes	Yes	Optional
Native	Thunderbolt Alternate Mode on DFP	Optional	Yes	—N/a
Native	Thunderbolt Alternate Mode on UFP	—N/a	Yes (before 2024) / Optional after (Note: The 2024 version of the USB4 specification removed the requirement for USB4 hubs to support TB3 compatibility on its UFP. The requirement to support TB3 compatibility on DFP remains unaffected. USB4 v2 Specification September 2024, p712, sec. 13)	Optional
Native	Other alternate modes	Optional	Optional	Optional

== Cable compatibility ==
The Type-C standard supports cable backward/downward compatibility in many situations. The compatibility typically only breaks between the different families of standards (USB 2.0, USB 3.2, USB4). There are "passive" cables, which consist mainly of plain conductors that can be used and repurposed for any manner of signals in either direction and thus have the highest forward and backward compatibility. It also contains active or hybrid active (mix of active-conductive and optical) cables which the standard mandates to have vast backward compatibility support, so as to behave as if they were regular, passive cables in the eyes of the consumer. But forward compatibility is limited for active cables due the active electronics inside. Only optically isolated active cables (OIAC), which should be clearly distinguishable by price, design, cable thickness, and advertising, are allowed to strip most of the backward compatibility away.

The Gen 4 transmission mode with PAM-3 uses signalling very different from that of previous modes. Every active component needs to explicitly support this new signaling, but it stays within all signal quality requirements of existing, passive Gen 3 cables (USB4 and TB3).

The direction of signalling also poses another challenge to active cables. Most USB signalling uses predefined wire-pairs for sending and others for receiving. But alternate modes, such as DP Alt mode may require to use all of the wire-pairs in the same direction. This switching of the direction of wire pairs makes active cables more complicated and therefore support for it is optional.

=== Cable naming and relation to specification versions ===
USB-IF intends only for the new bandwidth-based logos and names to be used with consumers. For cables, the type (passive, active) and the highest supported bandwidth are usually enough to uniquely identify a cable and its supported features. Although some active types make clear distinctions where further details on the type are required. Formally, a cable type and properties are defined by a distinct specification version, which was used during the development/design of said cable model, so each cable would be a valid and possibly certified cable according to a specific set of USB specification versions, like "Type-C 2.3, USB 3.2, USB4 Version 2.0". But the standard is also designed to be interoperable, in that a newer specification version typically adds new modes of operation, new cable types, but does not restrict previously existing things. Because that would make existing things incompatible with new products. For this purpose, even the older USB logos and labels did not include a specification version, but only stated "Certified USB SuperSpeed+ 10 Gbps". This logo identified cables that could support the 10 Gbit/s connection speeds of USB3 across both the USB 3.1 and USB 3.2 version, because the requirements for the cables have not changed. Thus, a precise specification version is usually not relevant and would not make a difference.

Transmission modes such as Gen2×2 are also irrelevant to cables, as valid cables are either full-featured, having all the high speed wire-pairs for up to dual-lane connections at the stated speed or they are USB2-only or some other specific and restrictive type, as listed below.

=== USB4 cable compatibility ===
Overview of passive and active Type-C cables and their USB4 support
Cable type		Speed	Marketing names	Max. USB4 bit rate	Expected max. cable length (Note: Maximum cable lengths are not normative, but simply estimates of the USB specification, based on the expected physical limits of conventional copper cables.)	Other support				Power
	Remarks	Speed	Marketing names	Max. USB4 bit rate	Expected max. cable length	USB2	USB3	TB3	DP	Power
USB2	—N/a		Hi-Speed USB	No	≤ 4m	Yes	No	No	No	USB PD: 60W or 100W or 240W
Full-Featured passive	—N/a	Gen 1	USB 5Gbps	20 Gbit/s (Note: USB4 Gen 2 signaling has less strict signal requirements than USB3 Gen 2 signaling. Spec compliant Gen 1 cables support USB4 Gen 2 / 20 Gbit/s connections)	≤ 2m	Yes	5 Gbit/s	20 Gbit/s	Yes (Note: No specific max. DP speed guaranteed by Type-C specification)	USB PD: 60W or 100W or 240W
Full-Featured passive	—N/a	Gen 2	USB 20Gbps (USB 10Gbps deprecated)	20 Gbit/s	≤ 1m	Yes	Yes	20 Gbit/s	Yes	USB PD: 60W or 100W or 240W
Full-Featured passive	(incl. passive TB4 & TB5)	Gen 3 & Gen 4	USB 40Gbps USB 80Gbps	80 Gbit/s (or asymm.)	≤ 0.8m	Yes	Yes	Yes (Note: Old TB3 equipment may require an optional identification of the cable as "TB3 40 Gbit/s", because they predate the USB-C definition of Gen 3. Without this additional identification, these cables may only be seen as "20 Gbps" / Gen 2 by such equipment.Type-C Cable and Connector Specification 2023, p393)	Yes (Note: TB4 & TB5 cables up to 2m length (active & passive) are "universal cables", including DP support. DP guarantees may only include the highest speeds covered by DP 1.4 for TB4 (HBR3) or DP 2.1 for TB5 (UHBR20).)	USB PD: 60W or 100W or 240W
Full-Featured active (also optical hybrid)	—N/a	Gen 2	USB 20Gbps (USB 10Gbps deprecated)	20 Gbit/s	< 5m	Yes	Yes	Yes	Optional (Note: No specific max. DP speed guaranteed by Type-C specification. There are different implementations of active cable implementations that may behave differently.)	USB PD: 60W or 100W or 240W
Full-Featured active (also optical hybrid)	(incl. active TB4)	Gen 3	USB 40Gbps	40 Gbit/s	< 5m	Yes	Yes	Yes	Optional TB up to 2m	USB PD: 60W or 100W or 240W
Full-Featured active (also optical hybrid)	(incl. active TB5)	Gen 4	USB 80Gbps	80 Gbit/s (or asymm.)	< 5m	Yes	Yes	Yes	Optional TB up to 2m	USB PD: 60W or 100W or 240W
Full-Featured active (also optical hybrid)	USB3 active	Gen 2	?	No	< 5m	Yes	Yes	No	Optional	USB PD: 60W or 100W or 240W
OIAC	USB3	Gen 2	?	No	≤ 50m	only if optical	Gen 2 only (10 / 20 Gbit/s)	No	Optional	—N/a
OIAC	USB4	Gen 3	?	40 Gbit/s	≤ 50m	only if optical	Gen 2 only (10 / 20 Gbit/s)	Optional	Optional	—N/a
OIAC	USB4	Gen 4	?	80 Gbit/s (asymm. optional)	≤ 50m	only if optical	Gen 2 only (10 / 20 Gbit/s)	Optional	Optional	—N/a
Thunderbolt 3	passive	Gen 2	TB Logo without "3"	20 Gbit/s	≤ 2m	Yes	only 5 Gbit/s when > 1m	20 Gbit/s	Yes	USB PD: 60W or 100W
Thunderbolt 3	passive	Gen 3	TB Logo + "3"	80 Gbit/s (or asymm.)	≤ 0.8m	Yes	Yes	Yes	Yes	USB PD: 60W or 100W
Thunderbolt 3	active	Gen 3	TB Logo + "3"	No (Note: The Apple TB3 Pro cable is one of the few active TB3 cables that supports DP and USB3. It is unclear if that is special behavior or the cable would be compatible to USB4 as well."Apple now sells a $129 Thunderbolt 3 Pro cable". theverge.com. The Verge. 2020-07-27.)	(longest available: 3m)	Yes	(mostly no)	Yes	(mostly no)	USB PD: 60W or 100W
Thunderbolt 3	optical	Gen 3	TB Logo + "3"	No	?	No	No	Yes	No	—N/a

=== DP Alt Mode support for USB4 cables ===
The Type-C specification does not name specific DP speeds that it considers supported for passive cables where support is optional for active cables. The USB-C presentation on DP Alt mode calls out passive full-featured USB-C cables for their DisplayPort support and headroom for future DP speed increases. HBR3 was the highest available DP speed at the time.

Active cables may have additional complications, because the active electronics do not need to operate all high speed wire-pairs in the same direction for normal USB operations (but USB 80Gbps cables are mandated to support asymmetric connections, which includes at least some of the wire-pairs operating in either direction). Active cables can have further limitations, since the active electronics may only support specific signaling modes. There are 2 variants of active electronics. Linear ReDrivers only amplify the signal without any particular signaling mode or encoding in mind. ReTimers explicitly reconstruct the incoming signal for a higher quality result.

TB4 cables, even active ones, at least up to 2m in length, are guaranteed to support DP Alt mode. A specific maximum speed is also not mentioned, but the other requirements for TB4 all refer to DP 1.4 and its maximum speed of HBR3. TB5 renews the same guarantee for USB 80Gbps cables while referencing the DP 2.1 specification (up to UHBR20 speeds).

DP 2.1 aligned itself to the USB4 PHY layer, according to VESA, the creator of DisplayPort. It is unclear how complete this alignment is. However, the UHBR10 DP speed matches USB4 Gen 2 in bit rate and encoding, whereas the UHBR20 DP speed matches USB4 Gen 3 in bit rate and encoding. A USB and DP certification service lists USB 5Gbps cables (USB 3.2 Gen 1x1) as supporting UHBR10 speeds, which would fit for having the same requirements as USB 20Gbps (USB4 Gen 2x2) connections.

Anandtech reports that "this also means that DP Alt Mode 2.0 should largely work with USB4-compliant cables, although VESA is being careful to avoid promising compatibility with all cables".

There are linear redrivers and retimers available that are advertised for USB4 Gen 3 speeds and all current DP speeds up to UHBR20 and including UHBR13.5.

== Thunderbolt compatibility ==
=== Thunderbolt 3 ===
The USB4 specification states that a design goal is to "Retain compatibility with existing ecosystem of USB and Thunderbolt products." Compatibility with Thunderbolt 3 is required for USB4 hubs, where this is optional for USB4 hosts and USB4 peripheral devices. Compatible products need to implement 40 Gbit/s mode, at least 15W of supplied power and a different clock. Implementers need to sign the license agreement and register a Vendor ID with Intel.

The USB4 protocol is based on and related to the operating principles of Thunderbolt 3. The USB4 specification simply defines which features to disable, downgrade and which parameters to change to get to an implementation compatible with Thunderbolt 3. This includes, for example: limitation to daisy-chain topology (a hub must expose at most one USB4 DFP), downgrade of DP capabilities to DP 1.2, disabling any USB3 tunnel or the parallel USB 2.0 connection and switching back to the previous, slightly higher signaling rate of TB3. Any USB 3.x or USB 2.0 connection - if needed at all - is handled by PCIe-USB controllers and via the PCIe tunnel.

The TB3 connection is formally an Alt Mode and not a native USB operating mode. For this the extensible "vendor defined" mechanisms of USB PD are used to query cables and devices for support and to initiate the connection.

=== Thunderbolt 4 ===
During CES 2020, USB-IF and Intel stated their intention to allow USB4 products that optionally support any or all of the same functionality as Thunderbolt 4 products. The first products compatible with USB4 were Intel's Tiger Lake processors, with more devices appearing around the end of 2020.

Thunderbolt 4 is a "solution brand" around USB 40Gbps. Thunderbolt 4 mandates some features that are optional in USB4, including backward compatibility to Thunderbolt 3, minimum PCIe ("32 Gbps") and DP capabilities (2 DP tunnels, "4K60 each", HBR3+DSC).

For cables, it similarly mandates above-minimum features of at least 100W support and the less well defined "universality" for up to 2 meters.

Thunderbolt 4 even requires certain notebooks to support charging via Thunderbolt ports, which is otherwise independent of any USB4 support.

=== Thunderbolt 5 ===
Thunderbolt 5 is an upgrade over Thunderbolt 4 and likewise a solution brand around USB 80Gbps. It mandates even higher minimum PCIe ("64 Gbps") and DP capabilities (2 DP tunnels, "6K60 each", unclear min. DP speed). It also mandates support for asymmetric 120/40 Gbit/s connections from hosts to docks, but does not mention the reverse.

For cables, Thunderbolt 5 mandates 240W support and "universality" up to 2 meters.

Notably, other features that are part of the advertising of Thunderbolt 5, like USB 20Gbps (USB 3.2 Gen 2x2) or support for 3 DP tunnels at speeds of up to UHBR20 are optional even for Thunderbolt 5. While Intel's own controllers widely support these features and some are even available from newer Thunderbolt 4 controllers, not every Thunderbolt 5 device or controller does. See Known USB4 Controllers.

== Pinout ==
Type-C receptacle pinout

USB4 uses the Type-C connector with its 24 pins in a symmetrical shell. Type-C has 12 A pins on the top and 12 B pins on the bottom.

The CC configuration channel is used per the Type-C standard to detect connections, plug orientation (due to the reversible USB Type-C shell) and establishing USB PD communication to negotiate power and query the cable (eMarker) and opposing side for USB4 or TB3 capability. If all participants support USB4, the entering of USB4 mode is initiated. If not, the port may fall back on other alternative modes such as Thunderbolt 3 Alt mode, DP Alt mode or USB3 connections.

Once USB4 connection has been requested, USB4 uses the SBU channel to manage the overall connection, initialization, disconnect. All SuperSpeeed differential pairs are used for the main USB4 link. For Gen 2 and Gen 3 connections, TX1+, TX1−, RX1+, RX1− form lane one and TX2+, TX2−, RX2+, RX2− form lane two, each in sending and receiving direction respectively. Gen 4 connections can also use three pairs in one direction for the asymmetric modes. The differential D+ and D− pair is used for USB 2.0 transfer that runs independent of the other USB4 communication. While USB3 communication happens via a "tunnel" inside the main USB4 link, any USB2 communication with potential USB2 devices continues to happen over the same wires as it would without USB4.

USB4 only requires that PD communication occurs and that the participants have agreed upon an initial power contract, before proceeding to USB4 negotiation. They are otherwise independent and power can be renegotiated at any point (including direction changes) without disturbing the USB4 link and is only guided by the Type-C and PD specifications, not by USB4 itself.

Type-C receptacle A pin layout
Pin	Name	Description
A1	GND	Ground return
A2	SSTXp1 ("TX1+")	SuperSpeed differential pair #1, TX, positive
A3	SSTXn1 ("TX1-")	SuperSpeed differential pair #1, TX, negative
A4	V_{BUS}	Bus power
A5	CC1	Configuration channel
A6	Dp1	USB 2.0 differential pair, position 1, positive
A7	Dn1	USB 2.0 differential pair, position 1, negative
A8	SBU1	Sideband use (SBU)
A9	V_{BUS}	Bus power
A10	SSRXn2 ("RX2-")	SuperSpeed differential pair #4, RX, negative
A11	SSRXp2 ("RX2+")	SuperSpeed differential pair #4, RX, positive
A12	GND	Ground return

Type-C receptacle B pin layout
Pin	Name	Description
B12	GND	Ground return
B11	SSRXp1	SuperSpeed differential pair #2, RX, positive
B10	SSRXn1	SuperSpeed differential pair #2, RX, negative
B9	V_{BUS}	Bus power
B8	SBU2	Sideband use (SBU)
B7	Dn2	USB 2.0 differential pair, position 2, negative (Note: There is only a single non-SuperSpeed differential pair in the cable. This pin is not connected in the plug/cable.)
B6	Dp2	USB 2.0 differential pair, position 2, positive
B5	CC2	Configuration channel
B4	V_{BUS}	Bus power
B3	SSTXn2	SuperSpeed differential pair #3, TX, negative
B2	SSTXp2	SuperSpeed differential pair #3, TX, positive
B1	GND	Ground return

== Software support ==
USB4 is supported by:

- Linux kernel 5.6, released on 29 March 2020
- macOS Big Sur (11.0), released on 12 November 2020
- Windows 11, released with support for USB4 Version 1.0 on 5 October 2021
  - upgraded to USB4 Version 2.0 support including 80 Gbit/s around March 2024

=== Connection manager ===
Connection manager is the part of a USB4 host that manages connections across the entire USB4 topology, establishing of tunnels, handling any bandwidth reservations and data prioritization, like which DP tunnels can be established and at what speed. The USB4 driver in Windows 11 implements native OS support of USB4, where the connection manager is part of a driver that only works with matching controllers. Older controllers had the connection manager implemented inside their firmware and thus required far less support from the OS.

On Linux, the USB4 and Thunderbolt driver (named "thunderbolt") supports both firmware-managed and also OS-managed controllers via the same tools.

== Hardware support ==
Brad Saunders, CEO of the USB Promoter Group, anticipates that most PCs with USB4 will support Thunderbolt 3, but for phones the manufacturers are less likely to implement Thunderbolt 3 support.

On 3 March 2020, Cypress Semiconductor announced new Type-C power (PD) controllers supporting USB4, CCG6DF as dual port and CCG6SF as single port.

In November 2020, Apple unveiled MacBook Air (M1, 2020), MacBook Pro (13-inch, M1, 2020) and Mac mini (M1, 2020), featuring two USB 40Gbps (USB4 Gen 3) ports.

AMD also stated that Zen 3+ (Rembrandt) processors will support USB4 and released products do have this feature after a chipset driver update. However, AMD has only announced support for USB 20Gbps (USB 3.2 Gen 2×2) in Zen 4 processors that were released in September 2022. Intel supported Thunderbolt 3 and USB-C with their 8th generation mobile processors in 2018. For example, the Lenovo P52 has dual TB3 ports on the rear. TB/USB has evolved as Intel is able to refine logic design.

=== Known USB4 controllers ===
The following table of USB4 controllers lists what features the controllers could support. The boards or products in which they are used can often influence the specific supported features, for example by not connecting all inputs, configuring the controller differently for compatibility or power saving or by combining it with other, lower tier components.

For example, many USB4 controllers Intel builds into their CPUs require further external components such as ReTimers to reach the full 40 Gbit/s speeds. They can also be used in simpler configurations for only 20 Gbit/s.

Features of alternate connections, such as the native DP or USB3 speeds - which can differ from the speeds supported for DP and USB3 tunnels inside USB4 connections - may also depend on other components, such as the ReTimers used.

Known USB4 Controllers
Manufacturer	Controller	Family	Type	native managed (Note: Host controller is not managing itself with onboard firmware, but via ACPI and USB4 standard with generic OS drivers, such as Windows 11 USB4 drivers. Only applicable to host controllers. All other controllers have always been managed by the host's connection manager, no matter if that is implemented in firmware or by the OS.)	USB4 ver.	Speed Gbit/s	USB4 Ports (up / down)	DP In / out protocol adapters (Note: Protocol adapters are what converts between a tunnel and a connection external to USB4. DP In adapters map directly to some input from a GPU. DP Out adapters may be shared across multiple physical outputs, in which case they limit how many can be used at the same time.)	USB3 Gbit/s	PCIe (Note: Main PCIe port of the controller. Not applicable for CPU-integrated host controllers. If PCIe is only used internal to the controller, PCIe throughput specifications are rarely given.)	TB3 compat.	Other ports	Certified
Intel	JHL8540	Maple Ridge	Host	No	1	40	2 dn	2 in DP 1.4 (up to HBR3)	10 (integ. ctrl.)	x4 Gen 3 ("32 Gbit/s")	Yes	—N/a	TB4
Intel	JHL8440	Goshen Ridge	Hub / Peri.	—N/a	1	40	1 up, 3 dn	2 out DP 1.4 (up to HBR3)	10 (hub, integ. ctrl.)	(32 Gbit/s)	Yes	PCIe x1 Gen 3 dn, 1 USB3 dn	TB4
Intel	JHL8140	Hoover Ridge	Peri.	—N/a	1	40	1 up	2 out DP 1.4 (up to HBR3)	10 (hub, integ ctrl.)	—N/a	Yes	3 USB3/DP down, 1 USB3 dn	TB4
Intel	JHL9540	Barlow Ridge	Host	Yes	2	40	2 dn	3 in DP 2.1 (up to UHBR10, +UHBR20) (Note: Supports UHBR10 and all lower speeds. And UHBR20, while not supporting UHBR13.5 speeds. UHBR10 and UHBR20 are aligned to USB4 Gen 2 and Gen 3 respectively, UHBR13.5 is not aligned to any existing USB4 signaling.)	20 (integ. ctrl.)	x4 Gen 4 ("64 Gbit/s")	Yes	1 DP out (Note: Unclear how much the output can do / be used for yet. Per leak "side port", may only be a passthrough of the third DP input)	TB4
Intel	JHL9440	Barlow Ridge	Hub / Peri.	—N/a	2	40	1 up, 3 dn	3 out 2 in DP 2.1 (up to UHBR10, +UHBR20)	20 (hub, integ. ctrl.)	x4 Gen 4 ("64 Gbit/s")	Yes	2 DP in, 1 USB3 dn	TB4
Intel	JHL9580	Barlow Ridge	Host	Yes	2	80	2 dn	3 in DP 2.1 (up to UHBR10, +UHBR20)	20 (integ. ctrl.)	x4 Gen 4 ("64 Gbit/s")	Yes	1 DP out	TB5
Intel	JHL9480	Barlow Ridge	Hub / Per.	—N/a	2	80	1 up, 3 dn	3 out 2 in DP 2.1 (up to UHBR10, +UHBR20)	20 (hub, integ. ctrl.)	x4 Gen 4 ("64 Gbit/s")	Yes	2 DP in, 1 USB3 dn	TB5
Intel	Tiger Lake	CPU-integrated	Host	No	1	40	up to 2 + 2 dn (Note: "2+2" indicates 2 separate dual-port USB4 host routers. But because integrated into the CPU, can share functionality that is not technically part of USB4 host router, like USB3. Systems may share a common USB3 controller, supplying 1 USB3 root port per USB4 port, similar with PCIe ports.)	2 in/group: up to HBR3	10	(32 Gbit/s)	Yes	—N/a	TB4
Intel	Alder Lake	CPU-integrated	Host	Yes	1	40	up to 2 + 2 dn	2 in/group: up to HBR3	10 (Note: USB3 controller shared across all integrated USB4 ports)	—N/a	Yes	—N/a	TB4
Intel	Raptor Lake	CPU-integrated	Host	Yes	1	40	up to 2 + 2 dn	2 in/group: up to HBR3	10 (20 internal)	—N/a	Yes	native output: (Note: What the respective USB4 ports can output directly, instead of tunneled through USB4. Can be higher than tunneled support, as not limited by the USB4 specification and technically independent of USB4 operations/connections.) DP UHBR10, +UHBR20, USB3 20G	TB4
Intel	Meteor Lake	CPU-integrated	Host	Yes	1	40	up to 2 + 2 dn	2 in/group: up to HBR3	20	—N/a	Yes	native output: DP UHBR10, +UHBR20	TB4
Intel	Lunar Lake	CPU-integrated	Host	Yes	1	40	up to 2 +1 dn	2 in/group: up to HBR3	20	—N/a	Yes	native output: DP UHBR10, +UHBR20	TB4
Intel	Arrow Lake	CPU-integrated	Host	Yes	1	40	2 dn	2 in/group: up to HBR3	20	—N/a	Yes	native output: DP UHBR10, +UHBR20	TB4
AMD	AMD Renoir, Phoenix	CPU-integrated	Host	Yes	1	40	up to 1+1 dn	2 in/port up to HBR3	10	—N/a	Yes	native output: DP UHBR10	?
AMD	AMD Strix Point	CPU-integrated	Host	Yes	1	40	up to 1+1 dn	2 in/port up to HBR3	10	—N/a	Yes	native output: DP UHBR10	TB4
AMD	AMD Strix Halo	CPU-integrated	Host	Yes	1	40	up to 1+1 dn	2 in/port up to HBR3	10	—N/a	Yes	native output: DP UHBR20 (Note: Unclear, whether this includes UHBR13.5 support, unlike competing Intel products)	TB4
Apple	M1/2	Apple USB4/TB3	Host	?	1	40	?	1 in/port up to HBR3	10	—N/a	Yes	—N/a	TB3
Apple	M1-3 Pro, Max, M4	Apple TB4	Host	?	1	40	?	2 in/port up to HBR3	10	—N/a	Yes	—N/a	TB4
Apple	M3 Ultra, M4 Pro/Max	Apple TB5 (1st gen)	Host	?	2	80	?	2 in/port up to UHBR10, +UHBR20	10	—N/a	Yes	—N/a	TB5
Apple	M5 Pro	Apple TB5 (2nd gen)	Host	?	2	80	?	3 in/port up to UHBR10, +UHBR20 ?	10 ?	—N/a	Yes	—N/a	TB5
Apple	M5 Max	Apple TB5 (2nd gen)	Host	?	2	80	?	4 in/port up to UHBR10, +UHBR20 ?	10 ?	—N/a	Yes	—N/a	TB5
Via	VL830	—N/a	Peri.	—N/a	1	40	1 up	1 out: DP 1.4 (up to HBR3)	10 (hub)	No	No	5 USB3 dn, 1 USB2 dn	—N/a
Via	VL832	—N/a	Peri.	—N/a	1	40	1 up	1 out: DP 1.4 (up to HBR3)	10 (hub)	No	No	5 USB3 dn, 1 USB2 dn	USB4
Asmedia	ASM2464PD	—N/a	Peri. / NVMe	—N/a	1	40	1 up	—N/a	20 (peripheral)	x4 Gen 4 ("64 Gbit/s")	Yes	(USB3 NVMe ctrl., only integ. PD)	TB4, USB4
Asmedia	ASM2464PDX	—N/a	Peri. / NVMe	—N/a	1	40	1 up	—N/a	20 (peripheral)	x4 Gen 4, (bifurcat. x1)	Yes	(USB3 NVMe ctrl.)	TB4, USB4
Asmedia	ASM4242	—N/a	Host	Yes	1	40	2 dn	2 in: DP 1.4 (up to HBR3)	20 (integ. ctrl.)	x4 Gen 4 ("64 Gbit/s")	Yes	—N/a	TB4, USB4
Realtek	RTX5490	—N/a	Peri. / Hub	—N/a	1	40	2 dn	USB4 up/dn: UHBR20, ?	20 (hub, integ. ctrl.)	?	Yes	2 USB3 20G, 1 DP UHBR20	USB4

== Specification References ==
- "USB Type-C® Cable and Connector Specification Release 2.3 | USB-IF". usb.org. USB-IF.
- "USB4® Specification v2.0 | USB-IF". usb.org. USB-IF.
  - "USB4® Specification v2.0, Adopters Agreement | USB-IF". usb.org. USB-IF.
  - "USB4® Specification v2.0, Connection Manager Guide | USB-IF". usb.org. USB-IF.
  - "USB4® Specification v2.0 Inter-Domain Service | USB-IF". usb.org. USB-IF.
- "USB4® Specification v2.0 with Errata and ECN through September 25, 2024 | USB-IF". usb.org. USB-IF.
- "USB Power Delivery | USB-IF". usb.org. USB-IF.
- "USB 2.0 Specification | USB-IF". usb.org.
- "USB 3.2 Revision 1.1 - June 2022 | USB-IF". usb.org. USB-IF.
