= Norator =

Theoretical electronics component

Norator electronic symbol

In electronics, a norator is a theoretical linear, time-invariant one-port which can have an arbitrary current and voltage between its terminals. A norator represents a controlled voltage or current source with infinite gain.

Inserting a norator in a circuit schematic provides whatever current and voltage the outside circuit demands, in particular, the demands of Kirchhoff's circuit laws. For example, the output of an ideal opamp behaves as a norator, producing nonzero output voltage and current that meet circuit requirements despite a zero input.

A norator is often paired with a nullator to form a nullor.

A nullator in parallel with a norator is equivalent to a short (zero voltage any current). A nullator in series with a norator is an open circuit (zero current, any voltage).
