= Nullor =

Nullor electronic symbol (balanced version)

Nullor electronic symbol (unbalanced version)

A nullor is a theoretical two-port network consisting of a nullator at its input and a norator at its output. Nullors represent an ideal amplifier, having infinite current, voltage, transconductance and transimpedance gain. Its transmission parameters are all zero, that is, its input–output behavior is summarized with the matrix equation

$$\begin{pmatrix}
v_1\\
i_1
\end{pmatrix}
=
\begin{pmatrix}
0 & 0 \\
0 & 0
\end{pmatrix}
\begin{pmatrix}
v_2\\
i_2
\end{pmatrix}$$

In negative-feedback circuits, the circuit surrounding the nullor determines the nullor output in such a way as to force the nullor input to zero.

Inserting a nullor in a circuit schematic imposes mathematical constraints on how that circuit must behave, forcing the circuit itself to adopt whatever arrangements are needed to meet the conditions. For example, an ideal operational amplifier can be modeled using a nullor, and the textbook analysis of a feedback circuit using an ideal op-amp uses the mathematical conditions imposed by the nullor to analyze the circuit surrounding the op-amp.

== Example: voltage-controlled current sink ==
Figure 1: Current sink based on an operational amplifier. Because the op-amp is modeled as a nullor, its input variables are zero regardless of the values of its output variables.

Figure 1 shows a voltage-controlled current sink. The sink is intended to draw the same current i_{OUT} regardless of the applied voltage V_{CC} at the output. The value of current drawn is to be set by the input voltage v_{IN}. Here the sink is to be analyzed by idealizing the op amp as a nullor.

Using properties of the input nullator portion of the nullor, the input voltage across the op amp input terminals is zero. Consequently, the voltage across reference resistor R_{R} is the applied voltage v_{IN}, making the current in R_{R} simply v_{IN}/R_{R}. Again using the nullator properties, the input current to the nullor is zero. Consequently, Kirchhoff's current law at the emitter provides an emitter current of v_{IN}/R_{R}. Using properties of the norator output portion of the nullor, the nullor provides whatever current is demanded of it, regardless of the voltage at its output. In this case, it provides the transistor base current i_{B}. Thus, Kirchhoff's current law applied to the transistor as a whole provides the output current drawn through resistor R_{C} as

$$i_\text{OUT} = \frac {v_\text{IN}} {R_\text{R}} - i_\text{B}$$

where the base current of the bipolar transistor i_{B} is normally negligible provided the transistor remains in active mode. That is, based upon the idealization of a nullor, the output current is controlled by the user-applied input voltage v_{IN} and the designer's choice for the reference resistor R_{R}.

The purpose of the transistor in the circuit is to reduce the portion of the current in R_{R} supplied by the op-amp. Without the transistor, the current through R_{C} would be i_{OUT} = (V_{CC} − v_{IN})/R_{C}, which interferes with the design goal of independence of i_{OUT} from V_{CC}. Another practical advantage of the transistor is that the op amp must deliver only the small transistor base current, which is unlikely to tax the op amp's current delivery capability. Of course, only real op amps are current-limited, not nullors.

The remaining variation of the current with the voltage V_{CC} is due to the Early effect, which causes the β of the transistor to change with its collector-to-base voltage V_{CB} according to the relation β = β_{0}(1 + V_{CB}/V_{A}), where V_{A} is the so-called Early voltage. Analysis based upon a nullor leads to the output resistance of this current sink as R_{out} = r_{O}(β + 1) + R_{C}, where r_{O} is the small-signal transistor output resistance given by r_{O} = (V_{A} + V_{CB})/i_{out}. See current mirror for the analysis.

Use of the nullor idealization allows design of the circuitry around the op-amp. The practical problem remains of designing an op-amp that behaves like a nullor.
