= Spectrum commons theory =

Radio spectrum management guidelines

The Spectrum Commons theory states that the telecommunication radio spectrum should be directly managed by its users rather than regulated by governmental or private institutions. Spectrum management is the process of regulating the use of radio frequencies to promote efficient use and gain a net social benefit. The theory of Spectrum Commons argues that there are new methods and strategies that will allow almost complete open access to this currently regulated commons with unlimited number of persons to share it without causing interference. This would eliminate the need for both a centralized, governmental management of the spectrum and the allocation of specific portions of the spectrum to private actors.

== The Spectrum debate ==
The Spectrum Commons theory was developed to open up the spectrum to everyone. Users can share a spectrum as a commons without prior authorization from higher governance or regime. Proponents of spectrum commons theory believe government allocation of the spectrum is inefficient, and to be a true commons one must open up the spectrum to the users and minimize both government and private control. The promise of the commons approach as one technologist, George Gilder once put it, "You can use the spectrum as much as you want as long as you don't collide with anyone else or pollute it with high-powered noise or other nuisances."

The most basic characteristic of spectrum commons theory is the unlimited access to spectrum resources, but as most modern theorists point out, there is a need for some constraint of those resources. A commons by definition is a resource that is owned or controlled jointly by a group of individuals. In order for a commons to be viable, someone must control the resource and set orderly sharing rules to govern its use.

The radio spectrum is a shared resource that perhaps most strikingly affects the well being of society. Its use is governed by a set of rules and narrow restrictions, designed to limit interference, whose origins go back nearly a century. While in recent years some of those rules have been replaced by more flexible market like arrangements, the fundamental approach of this institution remains essentially unchanged.

The early days of radio communication had no regulations, and everyone could use the spectrum without limitation. When a particular spectrum was filled up or overused, it created harmful interference. In order to manage the spectrum and prevent harmful interference, the NRA began to regulate the use of the spectrum. The period without regulation only lasted a few years, but this concept guided Spectrum Commons Theory.

Time	Event
1897	Marconi invented a radiocommunications device
1910	First attempt to regulate radio frequency by the US Navy
1912	Radio Act of 1912 authorized Secretary of Commerce and Labor and President to regulate Communication
1921	Secretary of Commerce and Labor refused to renew a license
1922	Inter-department Radio Advisory Committee set up
1923-1926	Court rejected Secretary of Commerce and Labor attempt to regulate radio communication
1926	Joint Resolution 90-day licenses for use of spectrum
1927	Radio Act of 1927
1934	Federal Communications Commission-founded
1940-1954	Highly regulated by authority-licensed renewal

In the 1950s, economist Ronald Coase pointed out that the radio spectrum was no scarcer than wood or wheat, yet government did not routinely ration those items. Coase instead proposed the private ownership of, and a market in, spectrum, which would lead to a better allocation of the resource and avoid rent-seeking behavior by would be users of the spectrum. In the late 1990s, it seemed like the property rights view might carry the day as Congress finally allowed the FCC to auction licenses to use spectrum.

Radio spectrum is doled out to users by what the Federal Communications Commission calls a “command-and-control” process. The [FCC] first carves out a block of spectrum and decides to what use it will be put (e.g., television, mobile telephony). Then, the agency gives away, at no charge, the right to use the spectrum to applicants it deems appropriate. The FCC makes its choices based largely on a public record generated by a regulatory proceeding. The rationale for such a system has been that the radio spectrum is a scarce resource, that there are more people who would like to use it than there is space available, and thus that the government must apportion it lest there be chaos.

== Types of Commons ==
=== Complete Open Commons ===
Spectrum Commons Theory although conceptually tries to focus on functioning as a completely free and open environment, facts points to this idea as flawed. Complete open commons, is a regime under which anyone has access to an unowned resource without limitation; no one controls access to the resource under open access. As previously mentioned however, in order for a commons to be viable, someone must control the resource and set orderly sharing rules to govern its use. While it is true that access to a commons can be open, this does not mean there is no central rule-setting authority.

Complete open commons is not a feasible regime for spectrum because, as a scarce resource, it will be subject to tragedy. Even given new spectrum-sharing technologies, a controller is still needed because these technologies require standards setting and enforcement in order to function.

=== Market Based Commons ===
Economists, who have long been skeptical about the ability of government agencies to allocate resources efficiently by “picking winners,” have preponderantly favored a market approach to the allocation of resources generally, and to the allocation of the spectrum in particular. As early as 1959, Ronald Coase wrote that spectrum was a fixed factor of production, like land or labor, and should be treated in the same way, with its use determined by the pricing system and awarded to the highest bidder. Coase concluded that government allocation of spectrum-use rights was not necessary to prevent interference and that, in fact, by preempting market allocation of spectrum, regulation was the source of extreme inefficiency.

Economists since Coase have favored a market-based approach if there is profit to be made from the charge of an entrance fee to such a park, then private enterprise and the profit motive can be relied upon to lead firms to carry out the necessary arrangements. And if entry into the commons is sufficiently beneficial to the entrants, there will indeed be profits to be made by giving them the opportunity to do so.

=== Supercommons ===
Another way to expand on the Spectrum Commons Theory is looking at it as a supercommons. As Werbach points out, a supercommons can operate alongside the property and commons regimes, which are just different configurations of usage rights associated with spectrum. In other words, the commons would be the baseline, with property encompassed within it, rather than the reverse. Bandwidth would not need to be infinite to justify a fundamental reconceptualization of the spectrum debate. Even with real-world scarcity and transaction-cost constraints, a default rule allowing unfettered wireless communication would most effectively balance interests to maximize capacity. The initial legal rule for this spectrum should be universal access. Anyone would be permitted to transmit anywhere, at any time, in any manner, so long as they did not impose an excessive burden on others.

== Modern Examples ==
=== Propagate Network's Swarm Logic Software ===
Which enables different communicate with one another and to choose nonconflicting frequencies or access points that will adjust their power levels to eliminate overlap. If this technology were able to reach a critical mass of adoption, even in localized areas, it could conceivably minimize those transaction costs necessary to adapt to neighboring uses of commons access spectrum. For neighboring buildings with scores of Wi-Fi transmitters, such technologies could prove very important, ensuring that different signals did not overlap and interfere with each other-thereby slowing data transmission and possibly triggering the destructive cycle of behavior noted above. Moreover, a logical extension of the swarm logic software is a function that could enable neighbors to identify those who deviated from accepted social norms in using commons access spectrum and, concomitantly, lower enforcement costs. Indeed, collective efforts-such as the Broadband Access Network Coordination ("BANC")-have already taken root to facilitate joint and controlled efforts to limit interference.
