= Zenbook =

Family of laptop computers made by Asus

ASUS Zenbook
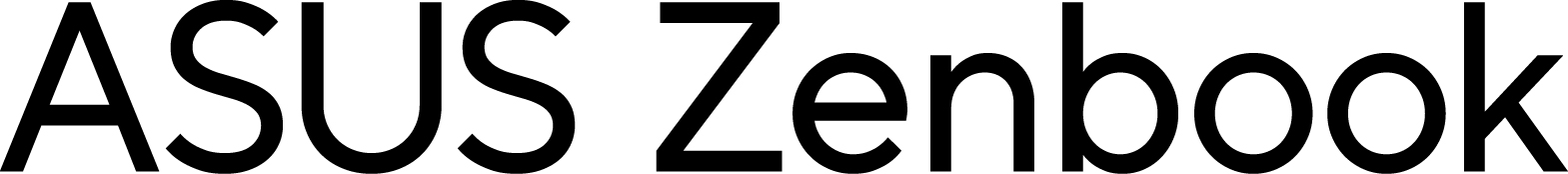
- Developer: Asus
- Manufacturer: Asus
- Type: Ultrabook, laptop
- Released: 2011; 15 years ago
- Lifespan: 2011–present
- Operating system: Windows
- CPU: Intel, AMD, Qualcomm
- Marketing target: Consumer
- Related: Asus Vivo
- Website: www.asus.com/content/zenbook/, www.asus.com/laptops/for-home/zenbook/

Asus Zenbook is a line of consumer-oriented high-end notebook computers produced by Asus. The first Zenbooks were released in October 2011 as Ultrabooks, and the original range of products has since been expanded to models ranging from smaller and power efficient notebooks to high-end and larger laptops with additions like discrete graphics processing units. As of 2025, the Asus Zenbook A serves as the company's flagship notebook computer.

The series is positioned by Asus as part of the thin-and-light segment within the premium consumer market. Asus designed the Zenbooks with brushed aluminium chassis and high rigidity, rather than plastic, the usual laptop construction material. A pattern of concentric circles on the lids is said to represent ripples in water and reflect the "zen philosophy" that designers wanted to portray when creating the laptops. Asus has also described its design approach as influenced by reductionism, aiming to simplify form while retaining functionality. As of 2024 there are various series including the standard Zenbook, extra slim and light Zenbook S, performance-oriented Zenbook Pro with dedicated graphics cards, convertible Zenbook Flip, dual screen Zenbook Duo, foldable tablet Zenbook Fold and portable Zenbook A.

Asus has also developed a proprietary material called Ceraluminum (from ceramic and aluminium) for the exterior of some Zenbook laptops.

== History ==
=== First Zenbooks ===
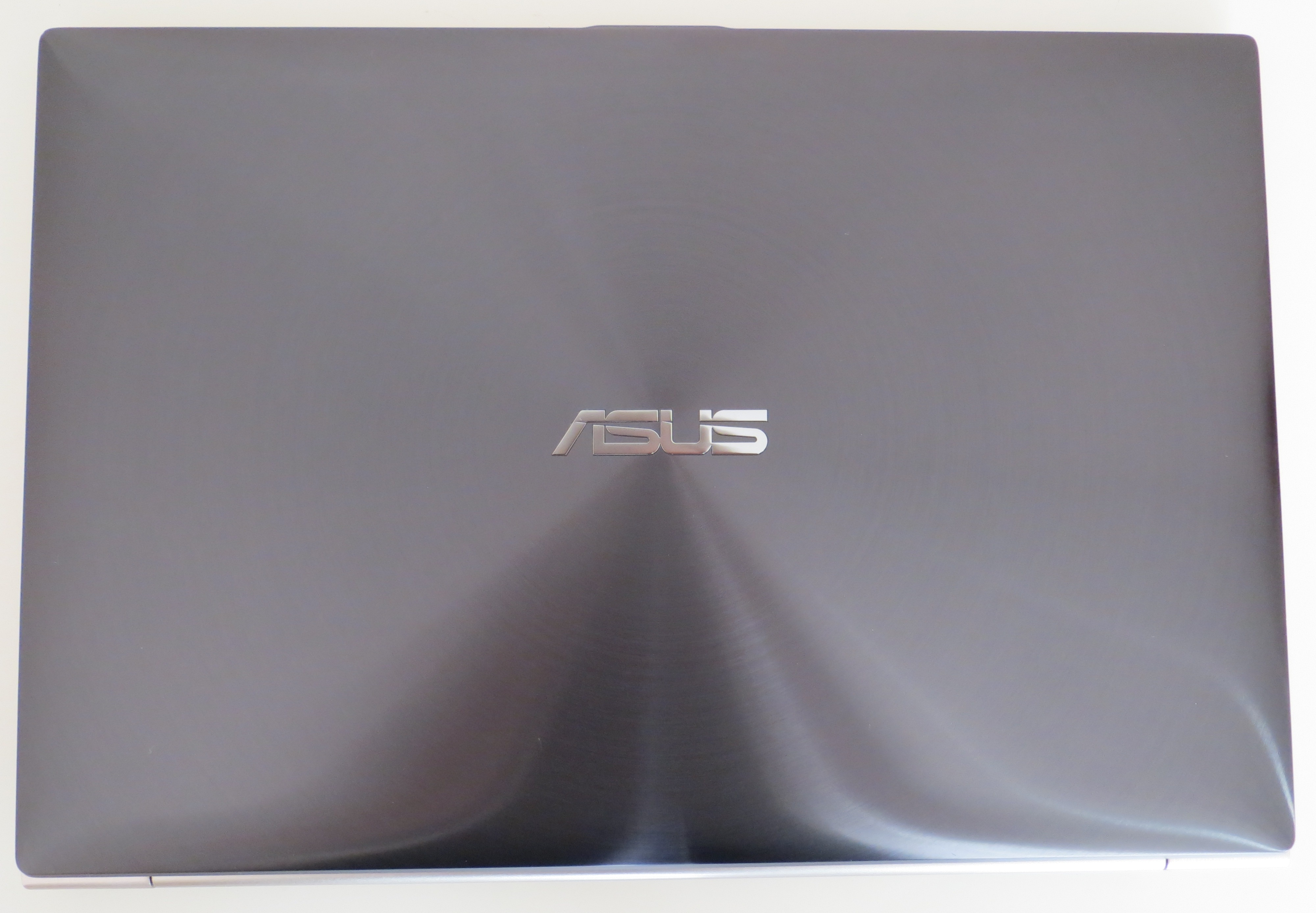
The concentric circles on the lid of a ZenBook are said to represent ripples in water.

In 2009 Asus released the UX50V, a 15-inch laptop that was focused on energy efficiency and had a thin profile. The laptop was rated poorly by reviewers as it under-performed and had mediocre battery life, despite the installed energy efficient hardware. Although not branded as one, it bore the same "UX" product code as many of the later Zenbooks and was an early foray into the ultraportable market. Asus unveiled the UX21 ultra-thin notebook at Computex 2011; later in October 2011, the UX21 (and a larger version, UX31) were made official under the Zenbook name. The Zenbook line began as Ultrabooks, designed to provide performance in a portable form factor. Sales in the U.S. began on October 12 starting at $999. The bodies of the Zenbooks are made of aluminium, chosen for its light weight, strength, vibration dampening, appearance and acoustic properties. Both the bodies and lids are CNC milled and brushed for appearance. Reviewers have noted the resulting superior rigidity and complimented the appearance of the Zenbook range.

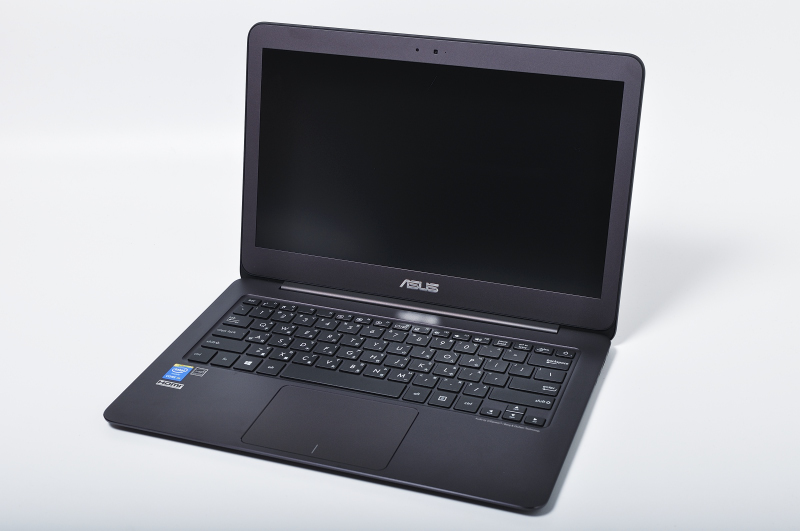
ASUS ZenBook UX305 from 2015

The Zenbook name was proposed by Asus chairman Jonney Shih to reflect the "zen philosophy" applied to the design. The chief designer, Loewy Chen, had wanted to incorporate design elements from luxury watches into his products for a long time. Zenbooks were the first opportunity to put this into practice, the crossover being achieved, he said, by "the unfolding of the laptop from the side recalling the elegance of minute and hour hand movements". The reference to watches is also reflected in the marketing of Zenbooks; Asus published design sketches overlaying an open Zenbook on a watch face, and video advertisements feature similar imagery. The concentric circles on the lid of Zenbooks were intended to look like ripples in water and to reflect "philosophical ideas such as the infinite nature of Zen thinking and self-improvement".

In April 2012, Asus announced a second generation Zenbook, branded as Zenbook Prime, upgraded to run on Intel's new Ivy Bridge-based CPUs. Shortly after it also introduced two lower-cost Zenbooks, as the UX32.

To preserve space, some Zenbooks use two PCBs connected by a communications ribbon so it can have ports on both sides of the device, with a heatsink and fan centred between them.

=== Recent history ===
Former Asus ZenBook wordmark (with capitalized 'B') used until the early 2020s

In 2015, ASUS introduced the Zenbook Pro series, featuring models with discrete graphics. The following year, the Zenbook Flip series was launched as a convertible 2-in-1 line.

In 2017, Asus debuted ScreenPad with the Zenbook Pro 15 UX580. The ScreenPad replaces the regular touchpad with a colour capactive touchscreen display. This technology was then in 2019 included in the Zenbook 13 (UX334), Zenbook 14 (UX434) and Zenbook 15 (UX534) and offered optionally on the lower end lineup of VivoBook S laptops.

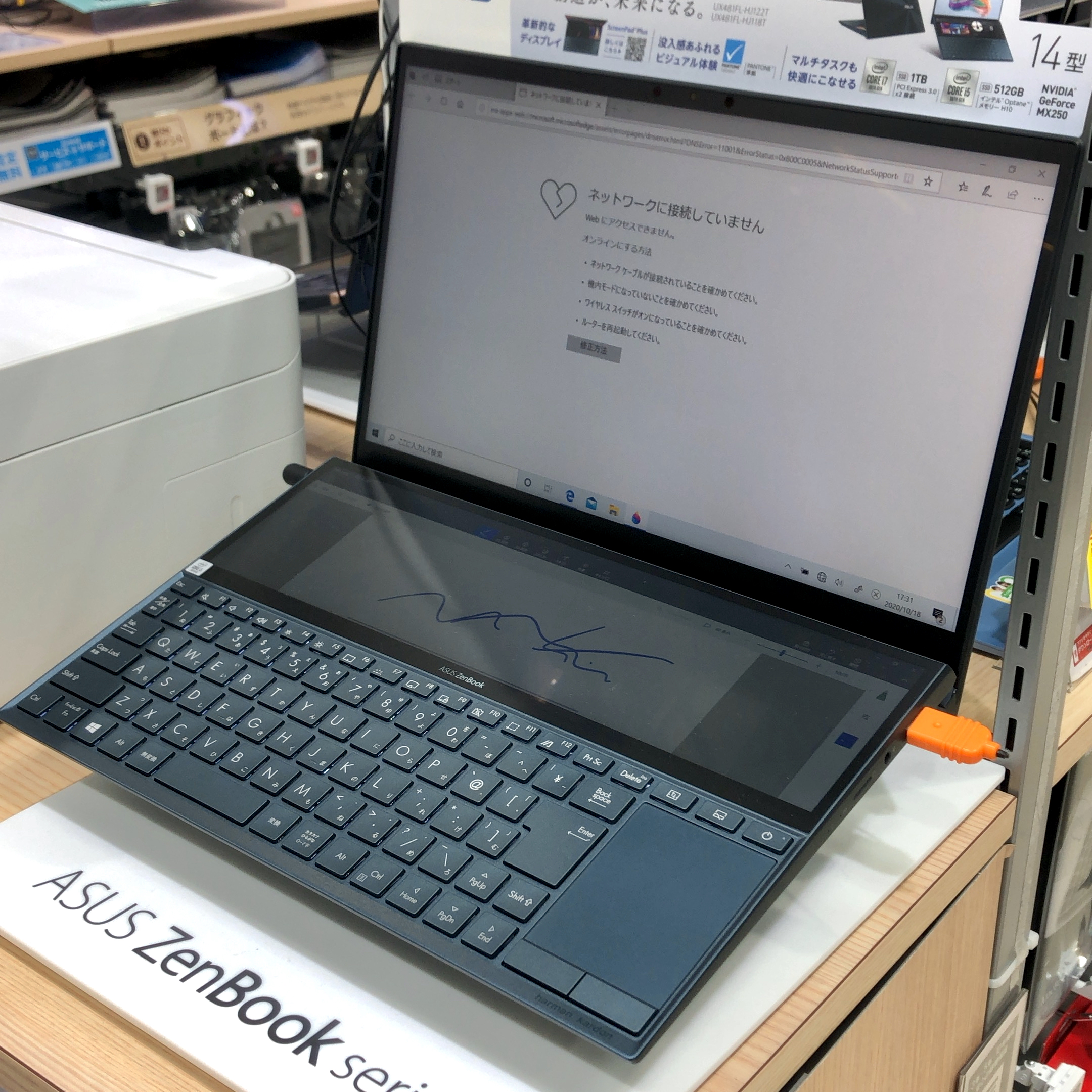
ASUS Zenbook Duo UX481FL (2019)

In 2018, ASUS expanded the Zenbook line with the Zenbook S series, emphasizing slim-and-light designs, and introduced the Zenbook Pro 15 (UX580) with the industry-first ScreenPad, which replaces the conventional touchpad with a colour capacitive touchscreen display.

In 2019, as a successor the 2018's Zenbook Pro, the Zenbook Duo and Zenbook Pro Duo feature two screens – one at the regular position and the other above keyboard. This second display resulted into the move of the keyboard nearer to the chin and the touchpad to where a numberpad would be similarly to Asus' gaming ROG Zephyrus laptop.

In 2022, ASUS introduced the Zenbook Fold (UX9702), a foldable OLED device capable of functioning in both tablet and laptop modes.

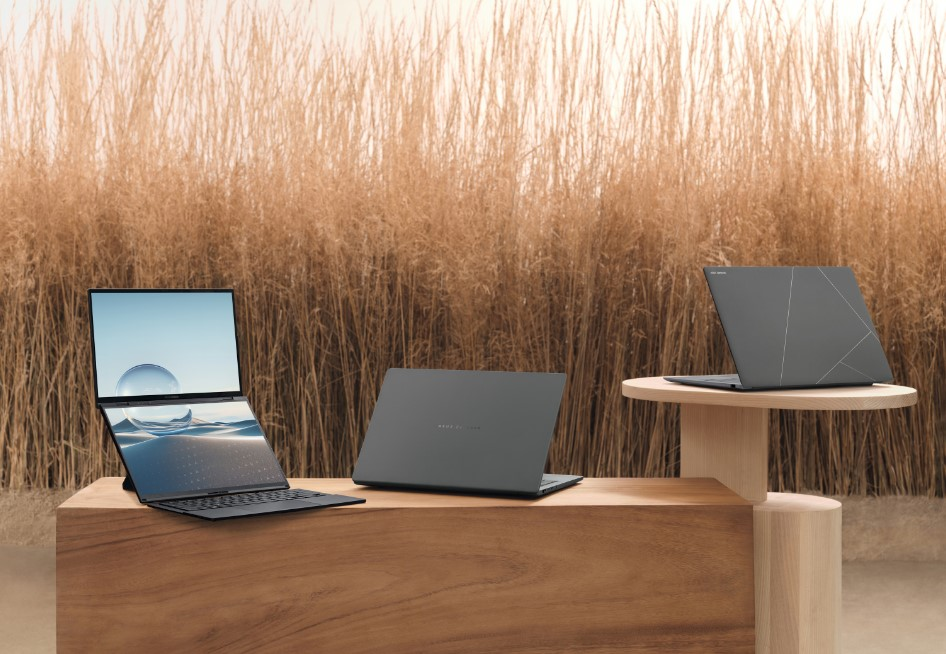
ASUS Zenbook series

In 2024, Asus announced a new Zenbook Duo (UX8406) described as the world's first 14-inch dual-screen OLED touchscreen laptop.The model featured two full-sized displays with a detachable keyboard, housed between the screens for transport and for use in a conventional laptop configuration. The new Zenbook Duo also included a kickstand to elevate the device for more comfortable use in portrait and landscape modes, and incorporated AI-related capabilities.

ASUS continues to integrate processors such as Intel Core Ultra with AI capabilities and AMD Ryzen AI series, along with OLED displays and the use of sustainable materials. Some Zenbook models are certified under the Intel Evo platform.

In June 2026, Asus introduced a new Zenbook 14 (UX3480) at Computex. It is available with Intel, AMD, and Qualcomm processors. The models include the UX3480AA with an Intel Core Ultra Series 3 processor, the UX3480KA with an AMD Ryzen AI 300 Series processor, and the UX3480QA with a Qualcomm Snapdragon X processor. All three versions feature Ceraluminum covers in Zabriskie Beige, Komodo Coral, or Arctic Blue.The Snapdragon model weighs 1.1 kg, while the Intel and AMD models weigh 1.2 kg. Depending on the configuration, the laptops have a 14-inch, 16:10 OLED display with an 88% screen-to-body ratio. Asus claims the Intel model offers up to 17 hours of video playback, while the AMD and Snapdragon models can last up to 21 hours.

== Design ==
At ASUS, design thinking is a core principle, emphasizing a human-centered approach that prioritizes user needs and experiences.This philosophy informs the development of products through an understanding of user interactions with technology. ASUS designs focus on both aesthetics and addressing real-world challenges, aiming for practical and meaningful innovation.The ASUS Zenbook series exemplifies this philosophy by integrating advanced technology, mechanical engineering, and material research with aesthetic considerations in its design.

== Features and technology ==
The ASUS Zenbook series integrates several design elements and technologies, contributing to its performance, user experience, and appearance. These include materials research, display development, hinge mechanisms, and input features.

=== Ceraluminum™ ===
Ceraluminum™ is a patented material developed by ASUS and used in the Zenbook series. According to the company, its development involved several years of refinement in color, texture, porosity, and hardness, resulting in a smudge-resistant surface.The material combines ceramic-like hardness with metallic flexibility, allowing for thin and durable laptop designs.It has also been compared to applications in fields such as aerospace and watchmaking.

=== Dual-screen design ===
The ASUS Zenbook DUO features a dual-screen design with a detachable Bluetooth keyboard and built-in kickstand. It supports multiple modes of use, including:

- Dual Screen Mode: extending the workspace across two displays for multitasking.
- Desktop Mode: both screens positioned upright with the keyboard detached.
- Sharing Mode: arranged side-by-side for reading or presentations.

The secondary screen is designed to support multitasking and professional creative workflows.

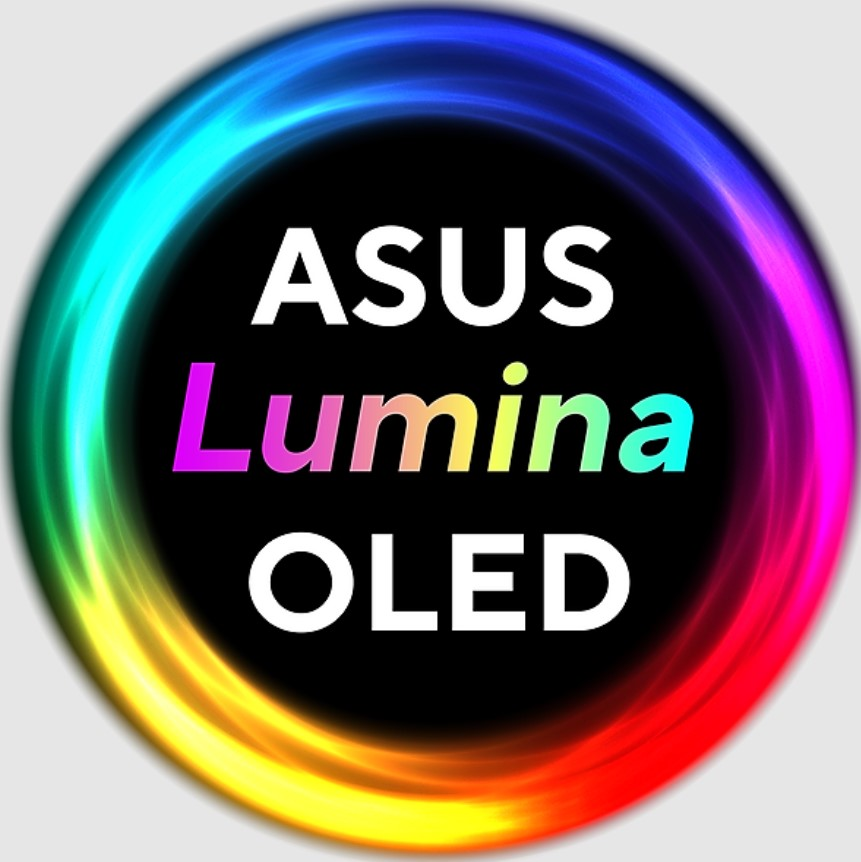
ASUS Lumina OLED

=== ASUS Lumina OLED ===
ASUS Lumina OLED is a branding used by ASUS for a category of OLED (Organic Light Emitting Diode) laptop displays, available in series such as Zenbook, Vivobook, and ProArt. These displays are characterized by high color accuracy, deep blacks, high contrast ratios, and fast response times. They also include features intended to reduce eye strain and extend display lifespan.

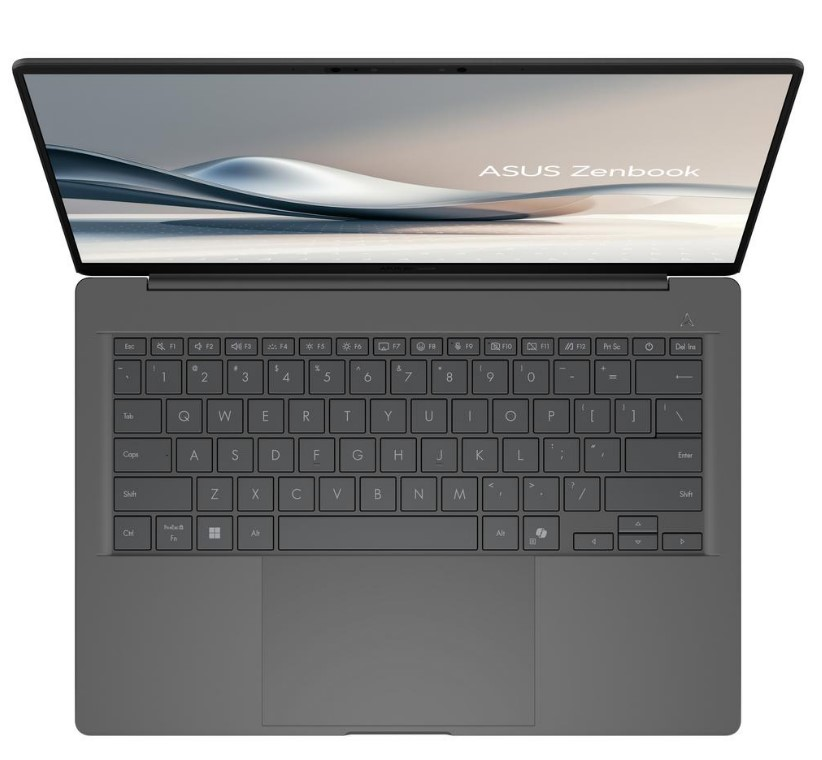
EasyLift Hinge

=== Hinges ===
- EasyLift™ hinge: The EasyLift hinge on the Zenbook A14 is designed to allow one-finger opening while maintaining a stable screen position.
- ErgoLift hinge: The ASUS ErgoLift hinge is a design used in several laptop series, including the Zenbook and Vivobook lines. The mechanism tilts the keyboard when the lid is opened, creating an angled typing position. It also allows additional airflow beneath the chassis for cooling and provides more space for downward-facing speakers.

=== Input features ===
- Smart Gesture Touchpad: ASUS Smart Gesture is a touchpad feature available on ASUS laptops, including the ProArt, Zenbook, and Vivobook series. It supports one-finger scrolling as well as controls for volume, brightness, and video playback.
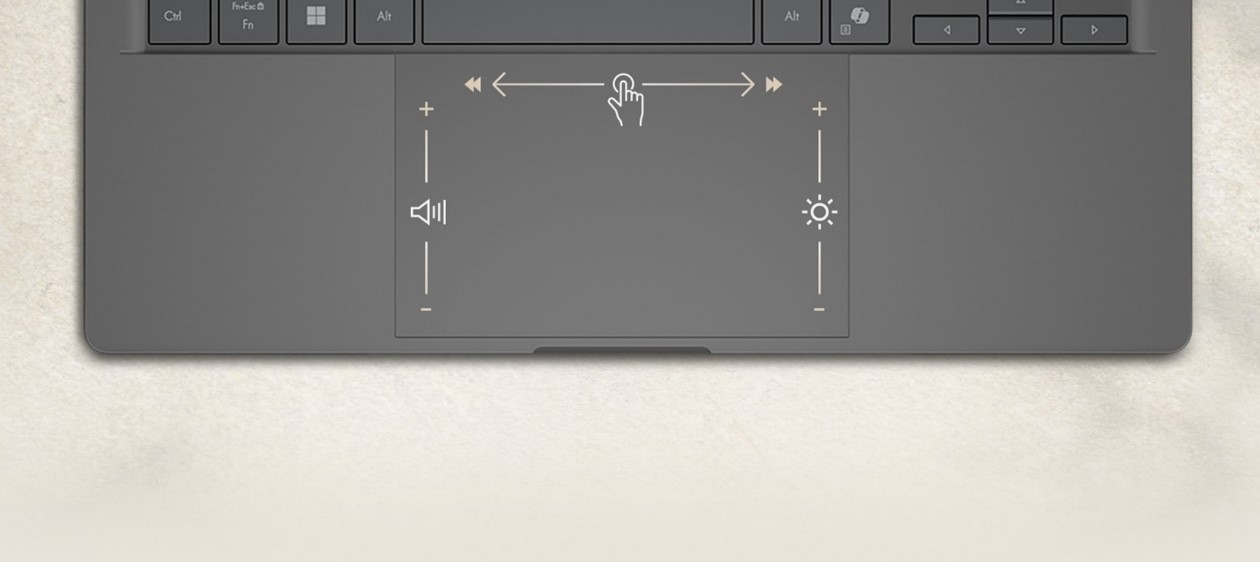
  Smart gesture touchpad
- NumberPad: The NumberPad is a feature available on certain ASUS laptops, particularly compact models without a physical numeric keypad. It integrates an illuminated numeric keypad into the touchpad. When activated, LED lights display the layout of a standard numeric keypad for data entry, and when deactivated, the touchpad functions normally for cursor control.

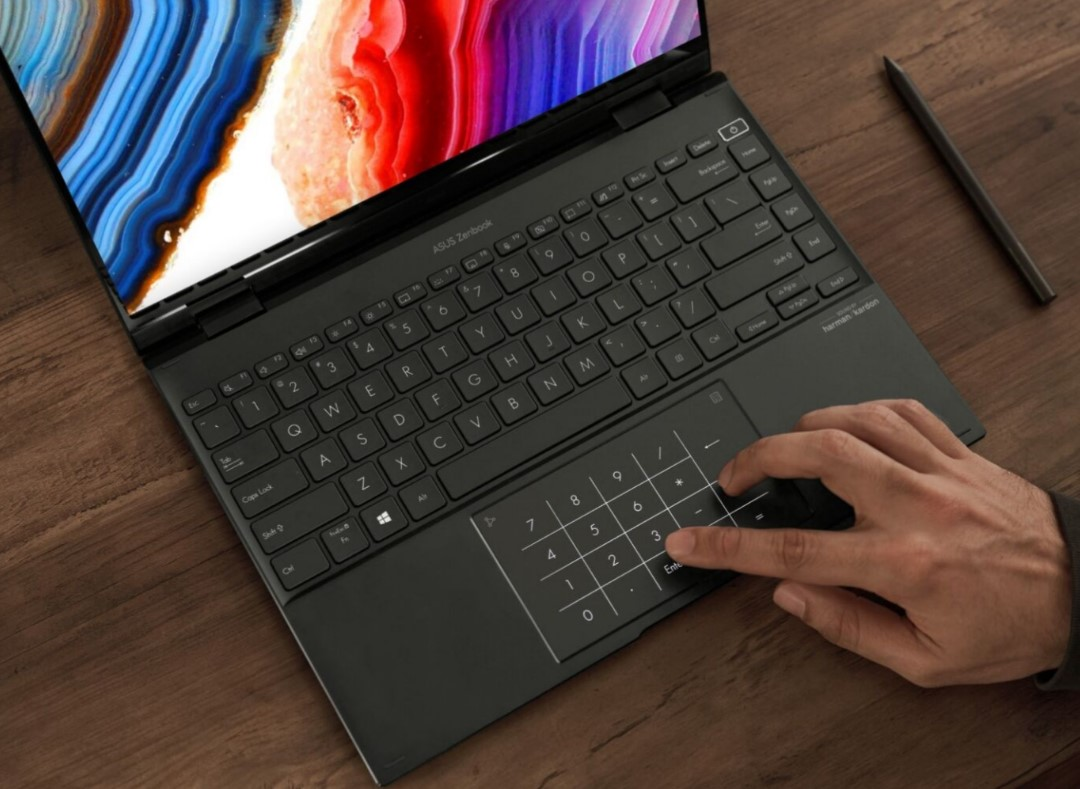
NumberPad

=== Full I/O ports ===
ASUS Zenbook models include a range of I/O ports within a slim chassis, such as USB-A, Thunderbolt 4 USB-C, HDMI, and audio jacks. This allows connection to external devices without the need for additional adapters.

== Series ==
Among the notable models, the Zenbook DUO features an OLED dual-display configuration, intended to improve multitasking workflows. The Zenbook A14/A16 is positioned as a lightweight Copilot+ PC with long battery life, suitable for extended daily use. Additionally, the Zenbook S14 is described as a slim AI PC that combines performance with a compact design.

=== Zenbook DUO ===
The Zenbook DUO incorporates an OLED dual-display configuration, designed to support multitasking workflows.

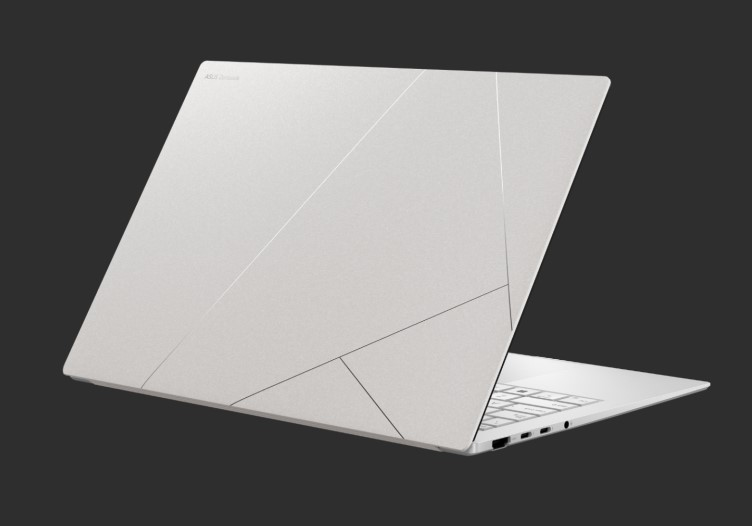
Zenbook S14 (UX5406SA)

=== Zenbook S ===
The Zenbook S14/S16 laptop is designed to be slim and lightweight. It uses miniaturized components, lightweight materials (Ceraluminum™), and CNC machining for its construction. The model also includes thermal solutions to manage heat and maintain performance.

=== Zenbook A ===
The Zenbook A14 /A16 is designed as an ultraportable model, combining lightweight construction, durability, performance, and long battery life. It uses a Ceraluminum™ chassis, cooling systems, and AI integration for performance optimization.

The ASUS Zenbook line has introduced products with varied form factors. The Zenbook Fold, for instance, includes a foldable OLED display that can shift from a compact size to a larger tablet. The Zenbook Flip offers a 2-in-1 convertible design, functioning as both a laptop and a touchscreen notebook.

== Reviews and awards ==
The ASUS Zenbook series has received international recognition from design competitions and technology reviewers, reflecting its role in laptop development. The series is noted for its slim and lightweight form factors combined with high performance, and for a design approach often described as nature-inspired and focused on ergonomics. ASUS Zenbook models have received awards such as the iF Design Award, Red Dot Product Design Award, Golden Pin Design Award, IDEA Award, and Good Design Award.

In technology reviews, the Zenbook series is frequently highlighted for its build quality, OLED display options, and battery performance, particularly within the ultraportable category. Outlets including PCMag and Laptop Mag have reported that Zenbook devices offer competitive performance and durability, with some reviews noting longer battery life compared to other laptops in the same class.

== Model comparison and specifications ==
=== Zenbook (2011–present) ===
| Model | Release date | Display Matte | Processor | Graphics adapter | Memory | Secondary storage | Wireless | Battery | Audio | Unit weight | Dimensions (Width × Height × Thickness) (Note: (closed, at thickest point)) | Peripheral connections | Operating System |
ZenBook (first generation)
| UX21E | Oct 2011 | 11.6" TN 1366 × 768 | 2nd Gen Intel Core: i3-2367; i5-2467M; i7-2677M | Intel HD Graphics 3000 | 4 GB 1333 MHz DDR3 Soldered | 64/128/256 GB SATA III SSD | 802.11 b/g/n Wi-Fi and Bluetooth 4.0 | 6 Cell, 4800 mAh, 35 Wh | Built-in stereo speakrs and microphone | 1.1 kg (2.42 lb) | 299 × 196 × 17 mm (11.8 × 7.7 × 0.67 inches) | 1 × 3.5 mm audio in/out jack; 1 × USB 3.0 port; 1 × USB 2.0 port; 1 × micro HDMI; 1 × mini VGA | Windows 7 |
| UX31E | Oct 2011 | 13.3" TN 1600 × 900 | 2nd Gen Intel Core: i5-2557M; i5-2557M; i7-2677M | Intel HD Graphics 3000 | 4 GB 1333 MHz DDR3 Soldered | 128/256 GB SATA III SSD | 802.11 b/g/n Wi-Fi and Bluetooth 4.0 | 4 Cell, 6840 mAh, 50 Wh | Built-in stereo speakrs and microphone | 1.3 kg (2.87 lb) | 325 × 223 × 17 mm (12.8 × 8.8 × 0.67 inches) | 1 × 3.5 mm audio in/out jack; 1 × USB 3.0 port; 1 × USB 2.0 port; 1 × micro HDMI; 1 × mini VGA; SD card slot (UX31E only) | |
ZenBook UX32
| UX32A | May 2012 | 13.3" TN 1366 × 768 | 2nd and 3rd Intel Core: i3-2367M; i5-3317U | Intel HD Graphics 3000; Intel HD Graphics 4000 | 4 GB 1600 MHz DDR3 Expandable | 500 GB hybrid drive with 24 GB SSD/256 GB SSD | 802.11 a/b/g/n Wifi and Bluetooth 4.0 | 6 Cell, 6520 mAh, 48 Wh | | 1.45 kg (3.20 lb) | 325 × 223 × 17 mm (12.8 × 8.8 × 0.67 inches) | 1 × 3.5 mm audio in/out ack; 3 × USB 3.0 ports; 1 × HDMI; 1 × mini VGA; SD card slot | |
| UX32VD | May 2012 | 13.3" TN 1366 × 768; 13.3" IPS 1920 × 1080 | Intel Core i7-3517U | Nvidia GeForce GT 620M | 4 GB, 2GB 1600 MHz DDR3 soldered + 2 GB 1600 MHz DDR3 Expandable | 500 GB hybrid drive with 24 GB SSD/256 GB SSD | 802.11 a/b/g/n Wifi and Bluetooth 4.0 | 6 Cell, 6520 mAh, 48 Wh | | 1.45 kg (3.20 lb) | 325 × 223 × 18 mm (12.8 × 8.8 × 0.71 inches) | 1 × 3.5 mm audio in/out jack; 3 × USB 3.0 ports; 1 × HDMI; 1 × mini VGA; SD card slot | |
| UX32L | Feb 2014 | 13.3" HD 1366x768; 13.3" IPS FHD 1920x1080 | 4th Gen Intel Core: i3-4010U; i5-4200U; i7-4500U | Intel HD Graphics 4400 + Nvidia GeForce 840M | 4 GB 1600 MHz DDR3L soldered with 1x expandable slot | 1 TB HDD / 500 GB SSH / 128 GB SSD | 802.11 a/b/g/n or 802.11ac and Bluetooth 4.0 | 3 Cell, 50 Wh | | 1.45 kg (3.20 lb) | 325 x 223 x 5.5~18 mm | 1 x 3.5mm audio in/out jack; 3 x USB 3.0 port; 1 x HDMI; 1 x mini Display Port; SD card slot | |
ZenBook (14" and 15")
| UX42VS | Nov 2012 | 14.0" TN 1366 × 768 | 3rd Gen Intel Core: i3-3217U; i5-3317U; i7-3517U | Nvidia GeForce GT 645M | 6 GB 1600 MHz DDR3 Expandable | 320/500/750/1000 GB HDD | 802.11 b/g/n Wifi and Bluetooth 4.0 | 4 Cell, 6140 mAh, 45 Wh | | 1.88 kg (4.15 lb) | 340 × 239 × 21 mm (13.4 × 9.4 × 0.83 inches) | 1 × 3.5 mm audio in/out jack 2 × USB 3.0 port 1 × micro HDMI; 1 × mini VGA; SD card slot 1 × RJ45 LAN port | |
| UX52VS | November 2012 | 15.6" IPS 1920 × 1080 | 3rd Gen Intel Core: i5-3317U; i7-3517U; i7-3610QM | Nvidia GeForce GT 645M | 4–10 GB 1600 MHz DDR3 | 320/500/750 GB hybrid drive with 24/32 GB SSD | 802.11 b/g/n Wifi and Bluetooth 4.0 | 4 Cell, 6140 mAh, 45 Wh | | 2.2 kg (4.94 lb) | 380 × 254.5 × 21 mm (14.96 × 10.0 × 0.83 inches) | 1 × 3.5 mm audio in/out jack 3 × USB 3.0 port 1 × HDMI; 1 × mini VGA; SD card slot 1 × RJ45 LAN port | |
ZenBook NX500
| NX500 | June 2014 | 15.6" IPS 3840×2160 | Intel Core i7-4712HQ | Nvidia GeForce GTX 850M | 4/8 GB 1600 MHz DDR3L | 128/256/512 GB SSD | TBA | 6 Cell, 96 Wh | | 2.2 kg (4.94 lb) | 378 x 255 x 19 mm (14.88 x 10.0 x 0.75 inches) | TBA | |
ZenBook UX302
| UX302LA | September 2013 | 13.3" IPS 1920×1080 | 4th Gen Intel Core: i5-4200U; i7-4500U | Intel HD Graphics 4400 | 2/4GB 1600 MHz DDR3L, upgradeable to 8 GB | 256GB 2.5" SATA3 SSD or 500/750 GB 2.5" SATA3 HDD | 802.11 a/b/g/n/ac Wi-Fi and Bluetooth 4.0 | 3 Cell, 50 Wh | | 1.5 kg | 325 x 226 x 5 ~17.2 mm | 1 × Microphone-in/Headphone-out jack 3 × USB 3.0 port(s) 1 × HDMI 1 × mini Display Port 1 × SD card reader 1 × AC adapter plug | |
| UX302LG | September 2013 | 13.3" IPS 1920×1080 | 4th Gen Intel Core: i5-4200U; i7-4500U | Intel HD Graphics 4400 + NVIDIA GeForce GT730M | 2/4GB 1600 MHz DDR3L, upgradeable to 8 GB | 256GB 2.5" SATA3 SSD or 500/750 GB 2.5" SATA3 HDD | 802.11 a/b/g/n/ac Wi-Fi and Bluetooth 4.0 | 3 Cell, 50 Wh | | 1.5 kg | 325 x 226 x 5 ~17.2 mm | 1 × Microphone-in/Headphone-out jack 3 × USB 3.0 port(s) 1 × HDMI 1 × mini Display Port 1 × SD card reader 1 × AC adapter plug | |
ZenBook UX303
| UX303UA | June 2014 | 13.3" 16:9 HD (1366x768) or IPS FHD (1920x1080) or IPS QHD+ (3200x1800) | 6th Gen Intel Core: i3-6100U; i5-6200U; i7-6500U | Integrated Intel HD Graphics 520 | DDR3L 1600 MHz SDRAM, On Board Memory 4 GB, DIMM Up to 12 GB | | | 3 Cells 50 Whrs Polymer Battery | | 1.45 | 323 x 223 x 19.2 | 1 × COMBO audio jack; 3 × USB 3.0 port; 1 × HDMI; 1 × mini Display Port; 1 × SD card reader; 1 × AC adapter plug | |
| UX303LN | June 2014 | 13.3" 16:9 IPS FHD (1920x1080) or QHD+ (3200x1800) | 4th or 5th Gen Intel Core: i5-4210U; i7-4510U; i5-5200U; i7-5500U | NVIDIA GeForce 840M with 2 GB DDR3 VRAM | DDR3L 1600 MHz SDRAM, On Board Memory 4 GB, SO-DIMM Up to 8 GB | | | 3 Cells 50 Whrs Polymer Battery | | 1.45 | 323 x 223 x 19.2 | 1 × COMBO audio jack; 3 × USB 3.0 port; 1 × HDMI; 1 × mini Display Port; 1 × SD card reader; 1 × AC adapter plug | |
| UX303UB | | 13.3" 16:9 HD (1366x768) or IPS FHD (1920x1080) or IPS QHD+ (3200 x 1800) | 6th Gen Intel Core: i5-6200U; i7-6500U | NVIDIA GeForce 940M with 2 GB DDR3 VRAM | DDR3L 1600 MHz SDRAM, On Board Memory 4 GB, DIMM Up to 12 GB | | | 3 Cells 50 Whrs Polymer Battery | | 1.45 | 323 x 223 x 19.2 | 1 × COMBO audio jack; 3 × USB 3.0 port; 1 × HDMI; 1 × mini Display Port; 1 × SD card reader; 1 × AC adapter plug | |
| UX303LA | | 13.3" 16:9 HD+ EWV (1600x900) or IPS FHD (1920x1080) | 4th or 5th Gen Intel Core: i3-5010U/4030U; i5-5200U/4210U; i7-5500U/4510U | Intel HD Graphics 4400 | DDR3L 1600 MHz SDRAM, On Board Memory 4 GB, 1x DIMM socket, DIMM Up to 8 GB | | | 3 Cells 50 Whrs Polymer Battery | | 1.45 | 323 x 223 x 19.2 | 1 × COMBO audio jack; 3 × USB 3.0 port; 1 × HDMI; 1 × mini Display Port; 1 × SD card reader; 1 × AC adapter plug | |
| UX303LB | | 13.3" 16:9 IPS FHD (1920x1080) or QHD+ (3200 x 1800) | 5th Gen Intel Core: i5-5200U; i7-5500U | NVIDIA GeForce 940M with 2 GB DDR3 VRAM | DDR3L 1600 MHz SDRAM, On Board Memory 4 GB, 1x DIMM socket, DIMM Up to 8 GB | | | 3 Cells 50 Whrs Polymer Battery | | 1.45 | 323 x 223 x 19.2 | 1 × COMBO audio jack; 3 × USB 3.0 port; 1 × HDMI; 1 × mini Display Port; 1 × SD card reader; 1 × AC adapter plug | |
ZenBook UX305
| UX305FA | September 2014 | 13.3" IPS FHD (1920×1080) or IPS QHD+ (3200×1800) | Intel Core M 5Y10 Intel Core M 5Y71 | Intel HD Graphics 5300 | LPDDR3 1600 MHz SDRAM, 4 GB, upgradeable to 8 GB | 128, 256 or 512 GB SSD | 802.11 a/b/g/n/ac Wi-Fi and Bluetooth 4.0 | 45 Whrs Polymer Battery | | 1.2 kg | 324 x 226 x 12.3 | 1 × 3.5mm audio jack; 3 × USB 3.0 port; 1 × micro HDMI; 1 × AC adapter plug | |
| UX305CA | December 2015 | 13.3" IPS FHD (1920×1080) or IPS QHD+ (3200×1800) | Intel Core M 6Y30 Intel Core M 6Y54 Intel Core M 6Y75 | Intel HD Graphics 515 | LPDDR3 1600 MHz SDRAM, 4 or 8 GB | 128, 256 or 512 GB SSD | 802.11 a/b/g/n/ac Wi-Fi and Bluetooth 4.0 | 45 Whrs Polymer Battery | | 1.2 kg | 324 x 226 x 12.3 | 1 × 3.5mm audio jack; 3 × USB 3.0 port; 1 × micro HDMI; 1 × AC adapter plug | |
| UX305LA | September 2014 | 13.3" IPS FHD (1920×1080) or IPS QHD+ (3200×1800) | 5th Gen Intel Core: i3-5010U; i5-5200U; i7-5500U | Intel HD Graphics 5500 | LPDDR3 1600 MHz SDRAM, 4 or 8 GB | 128, 256 or 512 GB SSD | 802.11 a/b/g/n/ac Wi-Fi and Bluetooth 4.0 | 56 Whrs Polymer Battery | | 1.3 kg | 324 x 226 x 14.9 | 1 × 3.5 mm audio jack; 2 × USB 3.0 port; 1 × USB 2.0 port; 1 × micro HDMI; 1 × AC adapter plug | |
| UX305UA | December 2015 | 13.3" IPS FHD (1920×1080) or IPS QHD+ (3200×1800) | 6th Gen Intel Core: i3-6100U; i5-6200U; i7-6500U | Intel HD Graphics 520 | LPDDR3 1600 MHz SDRAM, 4 or 8 GB | 128, 256 or 512 GB SSD | 802.11 a/b/g/n/ac Wi-Fi and Bluetooth 4.0 | 56 Whrs Polymer Battery | | 1.3 kg | 324 x 226 x 16.0 | 1 × 3.5 mm audio jack; 2 × USB 3.0 port; 1 × USB 2.0 port; 1 × micro HDMI; 1 × AC adapter plug | |
ZenBook UX306
| UX306UA | May 2016 | 13.3" IPS FHD (1920×1080) or IPS QHD+ (3200×1800) | 6th Gen Intel Core: i5-6200U; i7-6500U | Intel HD Graphics 520 | LPDDR3 1600 MHz SDRAM, 8 GB, upgradeable to 16 GB | 256 or 512 GB SSD | 802.11 a/b/g/n/ac Wi-Fi and Bluetooth 4.0 | 57 Whrs Polymer Battery | | 1.31 kg | 324 x 226 x 13.7 | 1 × 3.5 mm audio jack; 1 × USB-A 3.0 port; 1 × USB-C with USB 5Gbps; 1 × micro HDMI; 1 × microSDXC card reader; 1 × AC adapter plug | |
ZenBook x10 series
| UX310UQ | March 2017 | 13.3" IPS FHD (1920×1080) or IPS QHD+ (3200×1800) | 6th and 7th Intel Core: i3-7100U/6100U; i5-7200U/6200U; i7-7500U/6500U | Intel HD Graphics 520/620 + NVIDIA GeForce 940MX | LPDDR3 1600 MHz SDRAM, 4 GB, upgradeable to 16 GB | 500 GB/1 TB 5400 RPM HDD, or 128/256/512 GB SSD | 802.11 a/b/g/n/ac Wi-Fi and Bluetooth 4.0 | 48 Whrs | | 1.4 kg | 323 x 223 x 18.4 | 1 × 3.5 mm audio jack 1 × USB 3.0 port 1 × USB 2.0 port 1 × USB-C with USB 5Gbps 1 × HDMI 1 × AC adapter plug | |
| UX310UA | Progressively updated | 13.3" IPS FHD (1920×1080) or IPS QHD+ (3200×1800) | 6th, 7th and 8th Gen Intel Core: i3-7100U/6100U; i5-8250U/7200U/6200U; i7-8550U/7500U/6500U | Intel HD Graphics 520/620 or Intel UHD Graphics 620 | LPDDR3 1600 MHz SDRAM, 4 GB, upgradeable to 16 GB | 500 GB/1 TB 5400 RPM HDD, or 128/256/512 GB SSD | 802.11 a/b/g/n/ac Wi-Fi and Bluetooth 4.0 | 48 Whrs | | 1.4 kg | 323 x 223 x 18.4 | 1 × 3.5 mm audio jack 1 × USB 3.0 port 1 × USB 2.0 port 1 × USB-C with USB 5Gbps 1 × HDMI 1 × AC adapter plug | |
| UX410UQ | March 2017 | 14.0" IPS FHD (1920×1080) | 6th or 7th Gen Intel Core: i5-7200U/6200U; i7-7500U/6500U | Intel HD Graphics 520/620 + NVIDIA GeForce 940MX | LPDDR3 1600 MHz SDRAM, 4 GB, upgradeable to 16 GB | 500 GB/1 TB 5400 RPM HDD, or 128/256/512 GB SSD | 802.11 a/b/g/n/ac Wi-Fi and Bluetooth 4.0 | 48 Whrs | | 1.4 kg | 323 x 223 x 19 | 1 × 3.5mm audio jack 1 × USB 3.0 port 2 × USB 2.0 port 1 × USB-C with USB 5Gbps 1 × HDMI 1 × AC adapter plug | |
| UX410UF | October 2017 | 14.0" IPS FHD (1920×1080) | 8th Gen Intel Core: i5-8250U; i7-8550U | Intel UHD Graphics 620 + NVIDIA GeForce MX130 | LPDDR3 1600 MHz SDRAM, 4 GB, upgradeable to 16 GB | 500 GB/1 TB 5400 RPM HDD, or 128/256/512 GB SSD | 802.11 a/b/g/n/ac Wi-Fi and Bluetooth 4.0 | 48 Whrs | | 1.4 kg | 323 x 223 x 19 | 1 × 3.5mm audio jack 1 × USB 3.0 port 2 × USB 2.0 port 1 × USB-C with USB 5Gbps 1 × HDMI 1 × AC adapter plug | |
| UX410UA | March 2017 | 14.0" IPS FHD (1920×1080) | 7th and 8th Gen Intel Core: i3-7100U; i5-8250U/7200U; i7-8550U/7500U | Intel HD Graphics 520/620 or Intel UHD Graphics 620 | LPDDR3 1600 MHz SDRAM, 4 GB, upgradeable to 16 GB | 500 GB/1 TB 5400 RPM HDD, or 128/256/512 GB SSD | 802.11 a/b/g/n/ac Wi-Fi and Bluetooth 4.0 | 48 Whrs | | 1.4 kg | 323 x 223 x 19 | 1 × 3.5mm audio jack 1 × USB 3.0 port 2 × USB 2.0 port 1 × USB-C with USB 5Gbps 1 × HDMI 1 × AC adapter plug | |
| UX510UX | March 2017 | 15.6" IPS FHD (1920×1080) or IPS UHD (3840×2160) | 6th Gen Intel Core: i5-6200U; i7-6500U | Intel HD Graphics 520 + NVIDIA GeForce GTX 950M | LPDDR3 1600 MHz SDRAM, 4 GB, upgradeable to 16 GB | 500 GB/1 TB 5400 RPM HDD, or 128/256 GB SSD | 802.11 a/b/g/n/ac Wi-Fi and Bluetooth 4.0 | 48 Whrs | | 2 kg | 382 x 255 x 19.9 | 1 × 3.5mm audio jack 2 × USB 3.0 port 2 × USB 2.0 port 1 × USB-C with USB 5Gbps 1 × HDMI 1 × AC adapter plug | |
| UX510UW | March 2017 | 15.6" IPS FHD (1920×1080) or IPS UHD (3840×2160) | 6th Gen Intel Core: i5-6200U; i7-6500U | Intel HD Graphics 520 + NVIDIA GeForce GTX 960M | LPDDR3 1600 MHz SDRAM, 4 GB, upgradeable to 16 GB | 500 GB/1 TB 5400 RPM HDD, or 128/256 GB SSD | 802.11 a/b/g/n/ac Wi-Fi and Bluetooth 4.0 | 48 Whrs | | 2 kg | 382 x 255 x 19.9 | 1 × 3.5mm audio jack 2 × USB 3.0 port 2 × USB 2.0 port 1 × USB-C with USB 5Gbps 1 × HDMI 1 × AC adapter plug | |
ZenBook x30/x31 Classic series
| UX330CA | March 2017 | 13.3" IPS FHD (1920×1080) | Intel Core m3-7Y30 | Intel HD Graphics 615 | LPDDR3 1600 MHz SDRAM, 4 GB, upgradeable to 16 GB | 128 GB SSD | 802.11 a/b/g/n/ac Wi-Fi and Bluetooth 4.x | 54 Whrs | | 1.2 kg | 323 x 223 x 12.3 mm | 1 × 3.5mm audio jack 2 × USB 3.0 port 1 × USB-C with USB 5Gbps 1 × micro HDMI 1 × SD card slot 1 × AC adapter plug | |
| UX330UA | March 2017 | 13.3" IPS FHD (1920×1080) or IPS QHD+ (3200×1800) | Intel Core i5-8250U Intel Core i5-7200U | Intel UHD Graphics 620; Intel HD Graphics 620 | LPDDR3 1600 MHz SDRAM, 4/8 GB, upgradeable to 16 GB | 256 GB SSD | 802.11 a/b/g/n/ac Wi-Fi and Bluetooth 4.x | 57 Whrs | | 1.2 kg | 323 x 223 x 13.5 | 1 × 3.5mm audio jack 2 × USB 3.0 port 1 × USB-C with USB 5Gbps 1 × micro HDMI 1 × SD card slot 1 × AC adapter plug | |
| UX331UA | April 2018 | 13.3" IPS FHD (1920×1080) | 8th Gen Intel Core: i5-8250U; i7-8550U | Intel UHD Graphics 620 | LPDDR3 1600 MHz SDRAM, 4/8 GB, upgradeable to 16 GB | 256 GB SSD | 802.11 a/b/g/n/ac Wi-Fi and Bluetooth 4.x | 50 Whrs | | 1.13 kg | 310 x 216 x 14 | 1 × 3.5mm audio jack 2 × USB 3.0 port 1 × USB-C with USB 5Gbps 1 × HDMI 1 × SD card slot 1 × AC adapter plug | |
| UX331UN | February 2018 | 13.3" IPS FHD (1920×1080) or IPS UHD (3840×2160) | 8th Gen Intel Core: i5-8250U; i7-8550U | Intel UHD Graphics 620 + NVIDIA GeForce MX150 | LPDDR3 1600 MHz SDRAM, 4/8 GB, upgradeable to 16 GB | 128/256/512 GB SATA SSD or 512 GB/1 TB PCIe SSD | 802.11 a/b/g/n/ac Wi-Fi and Bluetooth 4.x | 50 Whrs | | 1.13 kg | 310 x 216 x 14 | 1 × 3.5mm audio jack 2 × USB 3.0 port 1 × USB-C with USB 5Gbps 1 × HDMI 1 × SD card slot 1 × AC adapter plug | |
| UX430UA | November 2017 | 14" IPS FHD (1920×1080) | 7th and 8th Gen Intel Core: i3-7100U; i7-7500U; i7-8550U | Intel HD Graphics 620 | LPDDR3 1600 MHz SDRAM, 4/8 GB, upgradeable to 16 GB | 256/512 GB SATA SSD | 802.11 a/b/g/n/ac Wi-Fi and Bluetooth 4.x | 50 Whrs | | 1.25 kg | 324 x 225 x 15.9 | 1 × 3.5mm audio jack 2 × USB 3.0 port 1 × USB-C with USB 5Gbps 1 × micro HDMI 1 × SD card slot 1 × AC adapter plug | |
| UX430UF | November 2017 | 14" IPS FHD (1920×1080) | 7th and 8th Gen Intel Core: i3-7100U; i5-8250U; i7-8550U | Intel HD Graphics 620 + NVIDIA GeForce MX130 | LPDDR3 1600 MHz SDRAM, 4/8 GB, upgradeable to 16 GB | 128/256/512 GB SATA SSD | 802.11 a/b/g/n/ac Wi-Fi and Bluetooth 4.x | 50 Whrs | | 1.25 kg | 324 x 225 x 15.9 | 1 × 3.5mm audio jack 2 × USB 3.0 port 1 × USB-C with USB 5Gbps 1 × micro HDMI 1 × SD card slot 1 × AC adapter plug | |
| UX430UN | November 2017 | 14" IPS FHD (1920×1080) | 7th and 8th Gen Intel Core: i3-7100U; i5-8250U; i7-8550U | Intel HD Graphics 620 + NVIDIA GeForce MX150 | LPDDR3 1600 MHz SDRAM, 4/8 GB, upgradeable to 16 GB | 128/256/512 GB SATA SSD | 802.11 a/b/g/n/ac Wi-Fi and Bluetooth 4.x | 50 Whrs | | 1.25 kg | 324 x 225 x 15.9 | 1 × 3.5mm audio jack 2 × USB 3.0 port 1 × USB-C with USB 5Gbps 1 × micro HDMI 1 × SD card slot 1 × AC adapter plug | |
| UX530UQ | October 2017 | 15.6" IPS FHD (1920×1080) | 7th Gen Intel Core: i3-7100U; i5-7200U; i7-7500U | Intel HD Graphics 620 + NVIDIA GeForce 940MX | LPDDR3 2133 MHz SDRAM, 4/8 GB, upgradeable to 16 GB | 128/256/512 GB SATA SSD | 802.11 a/b/g/n/ac Wi-Fi and Bluetooth 4.x | 50 Whrs | | 1.63 kg | 360 x 246 x 16.9 | 1 × 3.5mm audio jack 1 × USB 3.0 port 2 × USB 2.0 port 1 × USB-C with USB 5Gbps 1 × HDMI 1 × SD card slot 1 × AC adapter plug | |
| UX530UX | October 2017 | 15.6" IPS FHD (1920×1080) | 7th Gen Intel Core: i3-7100U; i5-7200U; i7-7500U | Intel HD Graphics 620 + NVIDIA GeForce GTX 950M | LPDDR3 2133 MHz SDRAM, 4/8 GB, upgradeable to 16 GB | 128/256/512 GB SATA SSD | 802.11 a/b/g/n/ac Wi-Fi and Bluetooth 4.x | 50 Whrs | | 1.63 kg | 360 x 246 x 16.9 | 1 × 3.5mm audio jack 1 × USB 3.0 port 2 × USB 2.0 port 1 × USB-C with USB 5Gbps 1 × HDMI 1 × SD card slot 1 × AC adapter plug | |
ZenBook x33 series
| UX333FA | August 2018 | 13.3" IPS FHD (1920×1080) | 8th Gen Intel Core: i3-8145U; i5-8265U; i7-8565U | Intel UHD Graphics 620 | LPDDR4 2400 MHz SDRAM, 8 GB | 256 GB PCIe (X2) SSD; 512 GB PCIe (X2) SSD; 1 TB PCIe (X4) SSD | 802.11 a/b/g/n/ac Wi-Fi and Bluetooth 5.0 | 50 Wh, 3-cell battery | | 1.09 kg (anti-glare display); 1.19 kg (glossy display) | 302 × 189 × 16.9 | 1 × 3.5mm audio jack 1 × USB 3.1 port 1 × USB 2.0 port 1 × USB-C with USB 10Gbps 1 × HDMI 1 × microSD card slot 1 × AC adapter plug | |
| UX333FN | August 2018 | 13.3" IPS FHD (1920×1080) | 8th Gen Intel Core: i5-8265U; i7-8565U | Intel UHD Graphics 620 + NVIDIA GeForce MX150 | LPDDR4 2400 MHz SDRAM, 8 GB/16 GB | 256 GB PCIe (X2) SSD; 512 GB PCIe (X2) SSD; 1 TB PCIe (X4) SSD | 802.11 a/b/g/n/ac Wi-Fi and Bluetooth 5.0 | 50 Wh, 3-cell battery | | 1.09 kg (anti-glare display); 1.19 kg (glossy display) | 302 × 189 × 16.9 | 1 × 3.5mm audio jack 1 × USB 3.1 port 1 × USB 2.0 port 1 × USB-C with USB 10Gbps 1 × HDMI 1 × microSD card slot 1 × AC adapter plug | |
| UX433FA | August 2018 | 14.0" IPS FHD (1920×1080) | 8th Gen Intel Core: i3-8145U; i5-8265U; i7-8565U | Intel UHD Graphics 620 | LPDDR4 2400 MHz SDRAM, 8 GB | 256 GB PCIe (X2) SSD; 512 GB PCIe (X2) SSD; 1 TB PCIe (X4) SSD | 802.11 a/b/g/n/ac Wi-Fi and Bluetooth 5.0 | 50 Wh, 3-cell battery | | 1.09 kg (anti-glare display); 1.19 kg (glossy display) | 319 × 199 × 15.9 | 1 × 3.5mm audio jack 1 × USB 3.1 port 1 × USB 2.0 port 1 × USB-C with USB 10Gbps 1 × HDMI 1 × microSD card slot 1 × AC adapter plug | |
| UX433FN | August 2018 | 14.0" IPS FHD (1920×1080) | 8th Gen Intel Core: i5-8265U; i7-8565U | Intel UHD Graphics 620 + NVIDIA GeForce MX150 | LPDDR4 2400 MHz SDRAM, 8 GB | 256 GB PCIe (X2) SSD; 512 GB PCIe (X2) SSD; 1 TB PCIe (X4) SSD | 802.11 a/b/g/n/ac Wi-Fi and Bluetooth 5.0 | 50 Wh, 3-cell battery | | 1.09 kg (anti-glare display); 1.19 kg (glossy display) | 319 × 199 × 15.9 | 1 × 3.5mm audio jack 1 × USB 3.1 port 1 × USB 2.0 port 1 × USB-C with USB 10Gbps 1 × HDMI 1 × microSD card slot 1 × AC adapter plug | |
| UX533FN | August 2018 | 15.6" IPS FHD (1920×1080) | 8th Gen Intel Core: i5-8265U; i7-8565U | Intel UHD Graphics 620 + NVIDIA GeForce MX150 | LPDDR4 2400 MHz SDRAM, 8 GB | 256 GB PCIe (X2) SSD; 512 GB PCIe (X2) SSD; 1 TB PCIe (X4) SSD | 802.11 a/b/g/n/ac Wi-Fi and Bluetooth 5.0 | 73 Wh, 4-cell battery | | 1.59 kg (anti-glare display); 1.69 kg (glossy display) | 354 x 220 x 17.9 | 1 × 3.5mm audio jack 1 × USB 3.1 port 1 × USB 3.0 port 1 × USB-C with USB 10Gbps 1 × HDMI 1 × SD card slot 1 × AC adapter plug | |
| UX533FD | August 2018 | 15.6" IPS FHD (1920×1080) | 8th Gen Intel Core: i5-8265U; i7-8565U | Intel UHD Graphics 620 + NVIDIA GeForce GTX 1050 Max-Q | LPDDR4 2400 MHz SDRAM, 8 GB | 256 GB PCIe (X2) SSD; 512 GB PCIe (X2) SSD; 1 TB PCIe (X4) SSD | 802.11 a/b/g/n/ac Wi-Fi and Bluetooth 5.0 | 73 Wh, 4-cell battery | | 1.59 kg (anti-glare display); 1.69 kg (glossy display) | 354 x 220 x 17.9 | 1 × 3.5mm audio jack 1 × USB 3.1 port 1 × USB 3.0 port 1 × USB-C with USB 10Gbps 1 × HDMI 1 × SD card slot 1 × AC adapter plug | |
ZenBook x34 series
| UX334FL | May 2019 | 13.3" IPS FHD (1920×1080) | 8th Gen Intel Core: i5-8265U; i7-8565U | Intel UHD Graphics 620 + NVIDIA GeForce MX250 | LPDDR4 2400 MHz SDRAM, 8 GB/16 GB | 256 GB PCIe (X2) SSD; 512 GB PCIe (X2) SSD; 1 TB PCIe (X4) SSD | 802.11 a/b/g/n/ac Wi-Fi and Bluetooth 5.0 | 50 Wh, 3-cell battery | | 1.22 kg | 302 × 189 × 17.9 | 1 × 3.5mm audio jack 1 × USB-A with USB 10Gbps 1 × USB 2.0 port 1 × USB-C with USB 10Gbps 1 × HDMI 1 × microSD card slot 1 × AC adapter plug | |
| UX334FL Edition 30 | May 2019 | 13.3" IPS FHD (1920×1080) | 8th Gen Intel Core: i5-8265U; i7-8565U | Intel UHD Graphics 620 + NVIDIA GeForce MX250 | LPDDR4 2400 MHz SDRAM, 8 GB/16 GB | 256 GB PCIe (X2) SSD; 512 GB PCIe (X2) SSD; 1 TB PCIe (X4) SSD | 802.11 a/b/g/n/ac Wi-Fi and Bluetooth 5.0 | 50 Wh, 3-cell battery | | 1.29 kg | 302 × 189 × 18.5 | 1 × 3.5mm audio jack 1 × USB-A with USB 10Gbps 1 × USB 2.0 port 1 × USB-C with USB 10Gbps 1 × HDMI 1 × microSD card slot 1 × AC adapter plug | |
| UX434FL | May 2019 | 14.0" IPS FHD (1920×1080), optional touchscreen | 8th Gen Intel Core: i5-8265U; i7-8565U | Intel UHD Graphics 620 + NVIDIA GeForce MX250 | LPDDR4 2400 MHz SDRAM, 8 GB/16 GB | 256 GB PCIe (X2) SSD; 512 GB PCIe (X2) SSD; 1 TB PCIe (X4) SSD | 802.11 a/b/g/n/ac Wi-Fi and Bluetooth 5.0 | 50 Wh, 3-cell battery | | 1.26 kg | 319 × 199 × 16.9 | 1 × 3.5mm audio jack 1 × USB-A with USB 10Gbps 1 × USB 2.0 port 1 × USB-C with USB 10Gbps 1 × HDMI 1 × microSD card slot 1 × AC adapter plug | |
| UX534FT | May 2019 | 15.6" IPS FHD (1920×1080) or IPS UHD (3840×2160) | 8th Gen Intel Core: i5-8265U; i7-8565U | Intel UHD Graphics 620 + NVIDIA GeForce GTX 1650 Max-Q | LPDDR4 2400 MHz SDRAM, 8 GB/16 GB | 256GB PCIe (X2) SSD 512 GB PCIe (X2) SSD 1 TB PCIe (X2) SSD 1 TB PCIe (X4) SSD | 802.11 a/b/g/n/ac Wi-Fi and Bluetooth 5.0 | 73 Wh, 4-cell battery | | 1.55 kg (anti-glare display) 1.65 kg (glossy display) | 354 x 220 x 18.9 | 1 × 3.5mm audio jack 1 × USB-A with USB 10Gbps 1 × USB-A with USB 5Gbps 1 × USB-C with USB 10Gbps 1 × HDMI 1 × SD card slot 1 × AC adapter plug | |
ZenBook 14X OLED
| UX5400 | September 2021 | Touch screen,14.0-inch, OLED, WQXGA+ (2880 x 1800) 16:10, Glossy display, 400nits, DCI-P3: 100% | Intel® Core™ i5-1135G7 Processor 2.4 GHz (8M Cache, up to 4.2 GHz, 4 cores) Intel® Core™ i7-1165G7 Processor 2.8 GHz (12M Cache, up to 4.7 GHz, 4 cores) | Inte Iris Xe Graphics, NVIDIA GeForce MX450,2 GB GDDR6 | 8GB LPDDR4X on board, Memory Max Up to:16 GB 16 GB LPDDR4X on board, Memory Max Up to:16 GB | 512GB M.2 NVMe PCIe 3.0 SSD; 1 TB M.2 NVMe PCIe 3.0 SSD; 512 GB M.2 NVMe PCIe SSD with 32 GB Intel Optane Memory; 1 TB M.2 NVMe PCIe SSD with 32 GB Intel Optane Memory | Wi-Fi 6 (802.11ax) +Bluetooth 5.0 (Dual band) 2*2 | 63WHrs, 3S1P, 3-cell Li-ion | | 1.40 kg (3.09 lbs) | 31.12 x 22.12 x 1.69 ~ 1.69 cm (12.25" x 8.71" x 0.67" ~ 0.67") | 1x USB-A with USB 10Gbps 2x Thunderbolt 4 supports display / power delivery 1x HDMI 2.0b 1x 3.5mm Combo Audio Jack Micro SD card reader | |
ZenBook 3 x90 series
| ZenBook 3 UX390UA | September 2017 | 12.5" IPS FHD (1920 × 1080) | 7th Gen Intel Core: i5-7200U; i7-7500U | Intel HD Graphics 620 | 16 GB 2133 MHz @ LPDDR3 | 512GB SATA SSD or 512 GB PCIe SSD | 802.11 a/b/g/n/ac Wi-Fi and Bluetooth 4.0 | 40 Wh, 6-cell | | 910 g | 296 x 191 x 11.9 | 1 x 3.5mm audio jack 1 x USB 3.1 Type-C port | |
| ZenBook 3 Deluxe UX490UA | June 2018 | 14" IPS FHD (1920 × 1080) | 8th Gen Intel Core: i5-8250U; i7-8550U | Intel UHD Graphics 620 | 8/16 GB @ 2133 MHz LPDDR3 | 256GB SATA SSD or 512 GB/1 TB PCIe SSD | 802.11 a/b/g/n/ac Wi-Fi and Bluetooth 4.1 | 46 Wh, 4-cell | | 1.1 kg | 329 x 214 x 12.9 | 1 x 3.5mm audio jack 3 x USB 3.1 Type-C port | |
Zenbook 14X OLED
| Zenbook 14X OLED UX3404VC | January 2023 | Up to 14.5" 120 Hz 2.8K OLED HDR display | Up to 13th gen Intel® Core™ i9 processor | Up to NVIDIA® GeForce® RTX 3050 | 16/32GB LPDDR5 on board Max Total system memory up to:16/32GB | 1TB M.2 NVMe™ PCIe® 4.0 SSD 512GB M.2 NVMe™ PCIe® 4.0 SSD | Wi-Fi 6E(802.11ax) (Triple band) 2*2 + Bluetooth 5.3 Wireless Card | 70WHrs, 3S1P, 3-cell Li-ion | Smart Amp Technology Built-in speaker Built-in array microphone harman/kardon (Premium) with Cortana voice-recognition support | 1.56 kg (3.44 lbs) | 32.18 x 22.56 x 1.69 ~ 1.69 cm (12.67" x 8.88" x 0.67" ~ 0.67") | 1x USB-A with USB 10Gbps 2x Thunderbolt 4 with support for display / power delivery (data speed up to 40Gbps) 1x HDMI 2.1 TMDS 1x 3.5mm Combo Audio Jack | Windows 11 Pro - ASUS recommends Windows 11 Pro for business |
| Zenbook 14X OLED UX3404VA | January 2023 | Up to 14.5" 120 Hz 2.8K OLED HDR display | Up to 13th gen Intel® Core™ i9 processor | Up to NVIDIA® GeForce® RTX 3050 | 8/16/32GB LPDDR5 on board Max Total system memory up to:8/16/32GB | 512GB M.2 NVMe™ PCIe® 4.0 SSD 1TB M.2 NVMe™ PCIe® 4.0 SSD | Wi-Fi 6E(802.11ax) (Triple band) 2*2 + Bluetooth 5.3 Wireless Card | 70WHrs, 3S1P, 3-cell Li-ion | Smart Amp Technology Built-in speaker Built-in array microphone harman/kardon (Premium) with Cortana voice-recognition support | 1.56 kg (3.44 lbs) | 32.18 x 22.56 x 1.69 ~ 1.69 cm (12.67" x 8.88" x 0.67" ~ 0.67") | 1x USB-A with USB 10Gbps 2x Thunderbolt 4 with support for display / power delivery (data speed up to 40Gbps) 1x HDMI 2.1 TMDS 1x 3.5mm Combo Audio Jack | Windows 11 Pro - ASUS recommends Windows 11 Pro for business |
Zenbook 15 OLED
| Zenbook 15 OLED UM3504 | April 2023 | 15.6” 2.8K OLED HDR NanoEdge display | Up to AMD Ryzen™ 7000 Series processors | Up to AMD Radeon™ graphics | 8/16/32GB LPDDR5 on board Max Total system memory up to:8/16/32GB | 1TB M.2 NVMe™ PCIe® 4.0 SSD 512GB M.2 NVMe™ PCIe® 4.0 SSD | Wi-Fi 6E(802.11ax) (Triple band) 2*2 + Bluetooth 5.3 Wireless Card Wi-Fi 6E(802.11ax) (Triple band) 1*1 + Bluetooth 5.3 Wireless Card | 67WHrs, 4S1P, 4-cell Li-ion | Smart Amp Technology Built-in speaker Built-in array microphone harman/kardon (Premium) with Cortana voice-recognition support | 1.40 kg (3.09 lbs) 1.50 kg (3.31 lbs) | 35.48 x 22.66 x 1.49 ~ 1.58 cm (13.97" x 8.92" x 0.59" ~ 0.62") | 1x USB-A with USB 5Gbps 1x USB-C with USB 40Gbps and USB PD 1x USB-C with USB 10Gbps and display / USB PD 1x HDMI 2.1 TMDS 1x 3.5mm Combo Audio Jack | Windows 11 Pro - ASUS recommends Windows 11 Pro for business |
Zenbook 14
| Zenbook 14 UM3406HA | January 2024 | Up to 14” 3K 120 Hz OLED HDR display | AMD Ryzen™ AI 300 Series Processor | AMD Radeon™ Graphics | 6GB LPDDR5X on board Max Total system memory up to:16GB LPDDR5X on board Max Total system memory up to:32GB | 512GB M.2 NVMe™ PCIe® 4.0 SSD 1TB M.2 NVMe™ PCIe® 4.0 SSD | Wi-Fi 6E(802.11ax) (Triple band) 2*2 + Bluetooth 5.3 Wireless Card | 75WHrs, 4S1P, 4-cell Li-ion | Smart Amp Technology Built-in speaker Built-in array microphone harman/kardon (Premium) | 1.20 kg (2.65 lbs) 1.28 kg (2.82 lbs) | 31.24 x 22.01 x 1.49 ~ 1.49 cm (12.30" x 8.67" x 0.59" ~ 0.59") | 1x USB-A with USB 5Gbps 1x USB-C with USB 40Gbps and USB PD 1x USB-C with USB 10Gbps and display / USB PD 1x HDMI 2.1 TMDS 1x 3.5mm Combo Audio Jack | Windows 11 Pro - ASUS recommends Windows 11 Pro for business |
| Zenbook 14 UM3406KA | January 2024 | Up to 14” 3K 120 Hz OLED HDR display | AMD Ryzen™ AI 300 Series Processor | AMD Radeon™ Graphics | 6GB LPDDR5X on board Max Total system memory up to:16GB LPDDR5X on board Max Total system memory up to:32GB | 512GB M.2 NVMe™ PCIe® 4.0 SSD 1TB M.2 NVMe™ PCIe® 4.0 SSD | Wi-Fi 6E(802.11ax) (Triple band) 2*2 + Bluetooth 5.3 Wireless Card | 75WHrs, 4S1P, 4-cell Li-ion | Smart Amp Technology Built-in speaker Built-in array microphone | 1.20 kg (2.65 lbs) 1.28 kg (2.82 lbs) | 31.24 x 22.01 x 1.49 ~ 1.49 cm (12.30" x 8.67" x 0.59" ~ 0.59") | 1x USB-A with USB 5Gbps 1x USB-C with USB 40Gbps and USB PD 1x USB-C with USB 10Gbps and display / USB PD 1x HDMI 2.1 TMDS 1x 3.5mm Combo Audio Jack Support XG MobileGC34 | Windows 11 Pro - ASUS recommends Windows 11 Pro for business |
| Zenbook 14 UM3406ZA | January 2024 | Up to 14” 3K 120 Hz OLED HDR display | AMD Ryzen™ AI 7 PRO 360 Processor | AMD Radeon™ Graphics | 32GB LPDDR5X on board Max Total system memory up to:32GB | 1TB M.2 NVMe™ PCIe® 4.0 SSD | Wi-Fi 6E(802.11ax) (Triple band) 2*2 + Bluetooth 5.3 Wireless Card | 75WHrs, 4S1P, 4-cell Li-ion | Smart Amp Technology Built-in speaker Built-in array microphone | 1.20 kg (2.65 lbs) | 31.24 x 22.01 x 1.49 ~ 1.49 cm (12.30" x 8.67" x 0.59" ~ 0.59") | 1x USB-A with USB 5Gbps 1x USB-C with USB 40Gbps and USB PD 1x USB-C with USB 10Gbps and display / USB PD 1x HDMI 2.1 TMDS 1x 3.5mm Combo Audio Jack | Windows 11 Pro - ASUS recommends Windows 11 Pro for business |
| Zenbook 14 UX3405MA | January 2024 | Up to 14" 3K 120 Hz OLED HDR display | Up to Intel® Core™ Ultra 9 processor (Series 2) | Intel® Arc™ Graphics *Intel® Arc™ Graphics is only available in models with Intel® Core™ Ultra 9-185H/ Ultra 7-155H/ Ultra 5-125H processors and at least 16 GB of dual-channel memory. Intel® Graphics *Intel® Arc™ Graphics is only available in models with Intel® Core™ Ultra 9-185H/ Ultra 7-155H/ Ultra 5-125H processors and at least 16 GB of dual-channel memory. | 32/16/8GB LPDDR5X on board Max Total system memory up to:32/16/8GB | 1TB M.2 NVMe™ PCIe® 4.0 SSD 512GB M.2 NVMe™ PCIe® 4.0 SSD | Wi-Fi 6E(802.11ax) (Triple band) 2*2 + Bluetooth 5.3 Wireless Card | 75WHrs, 2S2P, 4-cell Li-ion | Smart Amp Technology Built-in speaker Built-in array microphone harman/kardon (Premium) | 1.28 kg (2.82 lbs) 1.20 kg (2.65 lbs) 1.22 kg (2.69 lbs) | 31.24 x 22.01 x 1.49 ~ 1.49 cm (12.30" x 8.67" x 0.59" ~ 0.59") | 1x USB-A with USB 5Gbps 2x Thunderbolt 4 with support for display / power delivery (data speed up to 40Gbps) 1x HDMI 2.1 TMDS 1x 3.5mm Combo Audio Jack Support XG MobileGC34 | Windows 11 Pro - ASUS recommends Windows 11 Pro for business |
| Zenbook 14 UX3405CA | January 2024 | Up to 14" 3K 120 Hz OLED HDR display | Up to Intel® Core™ Ultra 9 processor (Series 2) | Intel® Arc™ Graphics | 32/16GB LPDDR5X on board Max Total system memory up to:32/16GB | 1TB M.2 NVMe™ PCIe® 4.0 SSD 512GB M.2 NVMe™ PCIe® 4.0 SSD | Wi-Fi 7(802.11be) (Tri-band)2*2 + Bluetooth 5.4 Wireless Card | 75WHrs, 2S2P, 4-cell Li-ion | Smart Amp Technology Built-in speaker Built-in array microphone | 1.28 kg (2.82 lbs) 1.20 kg (2.65 lbs) | 31.24 x 22.01 x 1.49 ~ 1.49 cm (12.30" x 8.67" x 0.59" ~ 0.59") | 1x USB-A with USB 5Gbps 2x Thunderbolt 4 with support for display / power delivery (data speed up to 40Gbps) 1x HDMI 2.1 TMDS 1x 3.5mm Combo Audio Jack Support XG MobileGC34 | Windows 11 Pro - ASUS recommends Windows 11 Pro for business |
| Zenbook 14 UX3480AA | June 2026 | Up to 14" 3K 120Hz OLED HDR display | Up to Intel Core Ultra 9 Processor 386H (Series 3) | Intel Graphics | 24/16GB LPDDR5X on board Max Total system memory up to:24/16GB | 1TB M.2 NVMe PCIe 4.0 SSD 512GB M.2 NVMe PCIe 4.0 SSD 256GB M.2 NVMe PCIe SSD | Wi-Fi 6E(802.11ax) (Triple band) 2*2 + Bluetooth 5.4 Wireless Card | 70WHrs, 4S1P, 4-cell Li-ion 50WHrs, 3S1P, 3-cell Li-ion | Smart Amp Technology Built-in speaker Built-in array microphone | 1.20 kg (2.65 lbs) 1.10 kg (2.43 lbs) | 31.12 x 21.58 x 1.39 ~ 1.39 cm (12.25" x 8.50" x 0.55" ~ 0.55") | 1x Thunderbolt 4 with support for display / power delivery (data speed up to 40Gbps) 1x USB 3.2 Gen 2 Type-C with support for display / power delivery (data speed up to 10Gbps) 1x USB 3.2 Gen 1 Type-A (data speed up to 5Gbps), 1x 3.5mm Combo Audio Jack 1x micro HDMI 2.1 TMDS | Windows 11 Home |
| Zenbook 14 UX3480KA | June 2026 | Up to 14" FHD 60Hz OLED display | Up to AMD Ryzen AI 7 345 Processor (Ryzen AI 300 Series) | AMD Radeon Graphics | 24/16GB LPDDR5X on board Max Total system memory up to:24/16GB | 512GB M.2 NVMe PCIe 4.0 SSD 1TB M.2 NVMe PCIe 3.0 SSD 256GB M.2 NVMe PCIe SSD | Wi-Fi 6E(802.11ax) (Triple band) 2*2 + Bluetooth 5.4 Wireless Card | 70WHrs, 4S1P, 4-cell Li-ion 50WHrs, 3S1P, 3-cell Li-ion | Smart Amp Technology Built-in speaker Built-in array microphone | 1.20 kg (2.65 lbs) 1.10 kg (2.43 lbs) | 31.12 x 21.58 x 1.39 ~ 1.39 cm (12.25" x 8.50" x 0.55" ~ 0.55") | 1x USB 4.0 Gen 3 Type-C with support for display / power delivery (data speed up to 40Gbps) 1x USB 3.2 Gen 2 Type-C with support for display / power delivery (data speed up to 10Gbps) 1x USB 3.2 Gen 1 Type-A (data speed up to 5Gbps), 1x 3.5mm Combo Audio Jack 1x HDMI 2.1 TMDS | Windows 11 Home |
| Zenbook 14 UX3480QA | June 2026 | Up to 14" 3K 120Hz OLED HDR display | Snapdragon X X1 26 100 Processor | Qualcomm Adreno GPU | 16/8GB LPDDR5X on board Max Total system memory up to:16/8GB | 512GB M.2 NVMe PCIe 4.0 SSD 256GB M.2 NVMe PCIe SSD | Wi-Fi 6E(802.11ax) (Triple band) 2*2 + Bluetooth 5.3 Wireless Card | 50WHrs, 3S1P, 3-cell Li-ion | Smart Amp Technology Built-in speaker Built-in array microphone | 1.30 kg (2.87 lbs) 1.10 kg (2.43 lbs) | 31.11 x 21.58 x 1.39 ~ 1.69 cm (12.25" x 8.50" x 0.55" ~ 0.67") | 2x USB 3.2 Gen 2 Type-C with support for display / power delivery (data speed up to 10Gbps) 1x USB 3.2 Gen 1 Type-A (data speed up to 5Gbps) 1x USB 4.0 Gen 3 Type-C with support for display / power delivery (data speed up to 40Gbps) 1x USB 3.2 Gen 2 Type-C with support for display / power delivery (data speed up to 10Gbps), 1x 3.5mm Combo Audio Jack 1x HDMI 2.1 TMDS | Windows 11 Home |

=== Zenbook Prime/Touch/Infinity (2012–14) ===
| Model | Release date | Display Matte | Processor | Graphics adapter | Memory | Secondary storage | Wireless | Battery | Audio | Unit weight | Dimensions (Width × Height × Thickness) | Peripheral connections | Operating System |
ZenBook Prime
| UX21A | Jun 2012 | 11.6" TN 1366 × 768; 11.6" IPS 1920 × 1080 | 3rd Gen Intel Core: i5-3317U; i7-3517U | Intel HD Graphics 4000 | 4 GB 1600 MHz DDR3 Soldered | 128/256 GB SATA III SSD | 802.11 a/b/g/n Wi-Fi and Bluetooth 4.0 | 6 Cell, 4800 mAh, 35 Wh | | 1.1 kg (2.42 lb) | 299 × 196 × 17 mm (11.8 × 7.7 × 0.67 in) | 1 × 3.5 mm audio in/out jack; 2 × USB 3.0 ports; 1 × micro HDMI; 1 × mini VGA; SD card slot (UX31A only) | |
| UX31A | Jun 2012 | 13.3" TN 1600 × 900; 13.3" IPS 1920 × 1080 | 3rd Gen Intel Core: i5-3317U; i7-3517U; i7-3537U | Intel HD Graphics 4000 | 4 GB 1600 MHz DDR3 Soldered | 128/256 GB SATA III SSD | 802.11 a/b/g/n Wifi and Bluetooth 4.0 | 4 Cell, 6840 mAh, 50 Wh | | 1.3 kg (2.87 lb) | 325 × 223 × 17 mm (12.8 × 8.8 × 0.67 in) | 1 × 3.5 mm audio in/out jack; 2 × USB 3.0 ports; 1 × micro HDMI; 1 × mini VGA; SD card slot (UX31A only) | |
ZenBook Touch
| UX500VZ | TBA | 15.6" IPS 1920 × 1080 | Intel Core i7-3612QM | Nvidia GeForce GT 650M | 4 GB 1600 MHz DDR3 | Up to 512 GB SATA III SSD | 802.11 a/b/g/n Wifi and Bluetooth 4.0 | 8 Cell, 4750 mAh, 70 Wh | | 2.0 kg (4.4 lb) | 380 × 254.5 × 20 mm (14.96 × 10.0 × 0.79 in) | 1 × 3.5 mm audio in/out jack; 3 × USB 3.0 port; 1 × HDMI; 1 × external subwoofer connector; 1 × mini VGA; SD card slot; 1 × RJ45 LAN port | |
| ZenBook Infinity | | | | | | | | | | | | | |
| UX301LA | September 2013 | 13.3" IPS 2560 × 1440 | 4th Gen Intel Core: i5-4200U; i7-4500U; i7-4558U | Intel HD Graphics 4400, or Iris Graphics 5100 | 8 GB 1600 MHz DDR3L | 2x128GB or 2x256 GB SSD in RAID 0 configuration | 802.11 a/b/g/n/ac Wifi and Bluetooth 4.0 | 6 Cell, 50.6 Wh | | 1.4 kg | 325 mm x 226 mm x 15.5 mm (12.8" x 8.9" x 0.62") | 1 × 3.5 mm audio in/out jack; 2 × USB 3.0 port; 1 × micro HDMI; SDXC card slot | |

=== Zenbook Flip (2016–present) ===
| Model | Release date | Display Matte | Processor | Graphics adapter | Memory | Secondary storage | Wireless | Audio | Battery | Unit weight | Dimensions (Width × Height × Thickness) | Peripheral connections | Operating System |
ZenBook Flip x60 series
| UX360CA | July 2016 | 13.3" IPS FHD (1920×1080) or IPS QHD+ (3200×1800) touchscreen | Intel Core M 6Y75 Intel Core M 6Y54 Intel Core M 6Y30 | Intel HD Graphics 515 | LPDDR3 1600 MHz SDRAM, 4 GB, upgradeable to 8 GB | 128/256/512 GB SATA SSD | 802.11 a/b/g/n/ac Wi-Fi and Bluetooth 4.0 | | 54 Wh, 3-cell battery | 1.3 kg | 323 x 220 x 13.9 | 1 × 3.5mm audio jack; 2 × USB-A with USB 5Gbps; 1 × HDMI; 1 × SD card slot; 1 × AC adapter plug | |
| UX360UA | July 2016 | 13.3" IPS FHD (1920×1080) or IPS QHD+ (3200×1800) touchscreen | Intel Core i7-7500U/6500U Intel Core i5-7200U/6200U | Intel HD Graphics 620/520 | LPDDR3 1600 MHz SDRAM, 8 GB, upgradeable to 16 GB | 128/256/512 GB SATA SSD | 802.11 a/b/g/n/ac Wi-Fi and Bluetooth 4.0 | | 57 Wh, 3-cell battery | 1.2 kg | 321 x 219 x 13.9 | 1 × 3.5mm audio jack; 2 × USB-A with USB 5Gbps; 1 × HDMI; 1 × SD card slot; 1 × AC adapter plug | |
| UX560UA | July 2016 | 15.6" IPS FHD (1920×1080) | 6th Gen Intel Core: i5-6200U; i7-6500U | Intel HD Graphics 520 | LPDDR3 1600 MHz SDRAM, 8 GB, upgradeable to 16 GB | 512GB SATA SSD or 1 TB 5400RPM HDD | 802.11 a/b/g/n/ac Wi-Fi and Bluetooth 4.0 | | 50 Wh, 4-cell battery | 2.2 kg | Unknown | 1 × 3.5 mm audio jack; 3 × USB-A with USB 5Gbps; 1 × USB-C with USB 5Gbps; 1 × HDMI; 1 × AC adapter plug | |
ZenBook Flip x61 series
| UX461UA | February 2018 | 14.0" IPS FHD (1920×1080) touchscreen | 8th Gen Intel Core: i5-8250U; i7-8550U | Intel UHD Graphics 620 | LPDDR3 2133 MHz SDRAM, 4/8 GB | 128/256/512 GB SATA SSD or 512 GB PCIe (X4) SSD | 802.11 a/b/g/n/ac Wi-Fi and Bluetooth 4.2 | | 57 Wh battery | 1.4 kg | 327 x 226 x 13.9 | 1 × 3.5mm audio jack 2 × USB-A with USB 5Gbps 1 × USB-C with USB 5Gbps 1 × HDMI 1 × microSD card slot 1 × AC adapter plug | |
| UX461UN | February 2018 | 14.0" IPS FHD (1920×1080) touchscreen | 8th Gen Intel Core: i5-8250U; i7-8550U | Intel UHD Graphics 620 + NVIDIA GeForce MX150 | LPDDR3 2133 MHz SDRAM, 8/16 GB | 128/256/512 GB SATA SSD or 512 GB PCIe (X4) SSD | 802.11 a/b/g/n/ac Wi-Fi and Bluetooth 4.2 | | 57 Wh battery | 1.5 kg | 327 x 226 x 13.9 | 1 × 3.5mm audio jack 2 × USB-A with USB 5Gbps 1 × USB-C with USB 5Gbps 1 × HDMI 1 × microSD card slot 1 × AC adapter plug | |
| UX461FN | February 2018 | 14.0" IPS FHD (1920×1080) touchscreen | 8th Gen Intel Core: i5-8250U; i7-8550U | Intel UHD Graphics 620 + NVIDIA GeForce MX150 | LPDDR3 2133 MHz SDRAM, 8/16 GB | 256/512GB SATA SSD or 512 GB PCIe (X4) SSD | 802.11 a/b/g/n/ac Wi-Fi and Bluetooth 5.0 | | 57 Wh battery | 1.5 kg | 327 x 226 x 13.9 | 1 × 3.5mm audio jack 2 × USB-A with USB 5Gbps 1 × USB-C with USB 5Gbps 1 × HDMI 1 × microSD card slot 1 × AC adapter plug | |
| UX561UA | February 2018 | 15.6" IPS FHD (1920×1080) touchscreen | 8th Gen Intel Core: i5-8250U; i7-8550U | Intel UHD Graphics 620 | DDR4 2400 MHz RAM, 8/16 GB | 128/512GB SATA SSD or 1 TB 5400RPM HDD | 802.11 a/b/g/n/ac Wi-Fi and Bluetooth 4.2 | | 52 Wh battery | 1.9 kg | 364 x 246 x 19.2 | 1 × 3.5mm audio jack 1 × USB-C with USB 5Gbps 2 × USB 3.0 ports 1 × SD card slot 1 × HDMI 1 × AC adapter plug | |
| UX561UN | February 2018 | 15.6" IPS FHD (1920×1080) touchscreen | 8th Gen Intel Core: i5-8250U; i7-8550U | Intel UHD Graphics 620 + NVIDIA GeForce MX150 | DDR4 2400 MHz RAM, 8/16 GB | 128/512GB SATA SSD or 1 TB 5400RPM HDD | 802.11 a/b/g/n/ac Wi-Fi and Bluetooth 4.2 | | 52 Wh battery | 1.9 kg | 364 x 246 x 19.2 | 1 × 3.5mm audio jack 1 × USB-C with USB 5Gbps 2 × USB 3.0 ports 1 × SD card slot 1 × HDMI 1 × AC adapter plug | |
| UX561UD | February 2018 | 15.6" IPS FHD (1920×1080) or IPS UHD (3840×2160) touchscreen | 8th Gen Intel Core: i5-8250U; i7-8550U | Intel UHD Graphics 620 + NVIDIA GeForce GTX 1050 | DDR4 2400 MHz RAM, 8/16 GB | 512GB SATA SSD or 512 GB PCIe SSD or 2 TB 5400RPM HDD | 802.11 a/b/g/n/ac Wi-Fi and Bluetooth 4.2 | | 52 Wh battery | 2.1 kg | 364 x 246 x 21 | 1 × 3.5mm audio jack 1 × USB-C/Thunderbolt 2 × USB 3.0 ports 1 × SD card slot 1 × HDMI 1 × AC adapter plug | |
ZenBook Flip x62 series
| UX362FA | August 2018 | 13.3" IPS FHD (1920×1080) touchscreen | 8th Gen Intel Core: i5-8265U; i7-8565U | Intel UHD Graphics 620 | LPDDR3 2133 MHz SDRAM, 8 GB, upgradeable to 16 GB | 256/512 GB PCIe SSD | 802.11 a/b/g/n/ac Wi-Fi and Bluetooth 5.0 | | 50 Wh, 3-cell battery | 1.3 kg | 305 x 196 x 16.9mm | 1 × 3.5mm audio jack 2 × USB-C with USB 10Gbps 1 × USB 2.0 port† 1 × HDMI† 1 × AC adapter plug | |
| UX562FD | August 2018 | 15.6" IPS FHD (1920×1080) or IPS UHD (3840×2160) touchscreen | 8th Gen Intel Core: i5-8265U; i7-8565U | Intel UHD Graphics 620 + NVIDIA GeForce GTX 1050 Max-Q | LPDDR4 2400 MHz SDRAM, 16 GB | 256/512 GB SATA SSD, or 512 GB PCIe SSD or 2 TB 5400 RPM SATA HDD | 802.11 a/b/g/n/ac Wi-Fi and Bluetooth 5.0 | | 57 Wh, 3-cell battery or 86 Wh 6-cell battery‡ | 1.9 kg | 357 x 226 x 20.9 | 1 × 3.5mm audio jack 1 × USB-C with USB 5Gbps 1 × USB-A with USB 5Gbps 1 × USB 2.0 1 × HDMI 1 × SD card reader 1 × AC adapter plug | |
†: This port is only on devices without world-facing cameras. ‡: The 86Wh option is only available for devices with SSD.
ZenBook Flip S UX370
| UX370UA | July 2018 | 13.3" IPS FHD (1920 × 1080) | Intel Core i7-7500U | Intel HD Graphics 620 | 16GB 2133 MHz LPDDR3 | 512 GB SATA SSD | 802.11 a/b/g/n/ac Wi-Fi and Bluetooth 4.2 | | 39 Wh battery | 1.1 kg | 311 x 211 x 10.9 | 1 x 3.5mm audio jack; 2 x Type-C port with USB 5Gbps | |
Zenbook 14 Flip OLED
| UP3404VA | January 2023 | 14" 16:10 2.8K OLED NanoEdge touchscreen | Up to 13th Gen Intel® Core™ i7 processor | Intel® Iris® Xe graphics | Up to 16 GB LPDDR5 4800 MHz memory | 1TB M.2 NVMe™ PCIe® 4.0 SSD 512GB M.2 NVMe™ PCIe® 4.0 SSD | 75WHrs, 2S2P, 4-cell Li-ion | Smart Amp Technology Built-in speaker Built-in array microphone harman/kardon (Premium) with Cortana voice-recognition support | Wi-Fi 6E(802.11ax) (Triple band) 2*2 + Bluetooth 5.3 Wireless Card | 1.50 kg (3.31 lbs) | 31.15 x 22.34 x 1.59 ~ 1.59 cm (12.26" x 8.80" x 0.63" ~ 0.63") | 1x USB-A with USB 10Gbps 2x Thunderbolt 4 with support for display / power delivery (data speed up to 40Gbps) 1x HDMI 2.1 TMDS 1x 3.5mm Combo Audio Jack | Windows 11 Pro - ASUS recommends Windows 11 Pro for business |

=== Zenbook Pro (2015–present) ===
| Model | Release date | Display Matte | Processor | Graphics adapter | Memory | Secondary storage | Wireless | Audio | Battery | Unit weight | Dimensions (Width × Height × Thickness) | Peripheral connections | Operating System |
ZenBook Pro x01 series
| UX501JW | May 2015 | 15.6" IPS FHD (1920×1080) or IPS UHD (3840×2160) | Intel Core i7-4720HQ | Intel HD Graphics 4600 + NVIDIA GeForce GTX 960M | LPDDR3 1600 MHz SDRAM, 4/8 GB, upgradeable to 16 GB | 128/256GB SATA SSD, or 512 GB PCIe (X4) SSD or 1 TB 5400rpm SATA HDD | 802.11 b/g/n Wi-Fi or 802.11 a/b/g/n/ac Wi-Fi and Bluetooth 4.0 | | 60 Wh, 4-cell battery or 96 Wh 6-cell battery | 2.06 kg (4-cell) or 2.27 kg (6-cell) | 383 x 255 x 20.6 (4-cell) 383 x 255 x 21.3 (6-cell) | 1 × 3.5mm audio jack; 3 × USB 3.0; 1 × HDMI; 1 × mini DisplayPort; 1 × Thunderbolt (some; 1 × SD card reader; 1 × AC adapter plug | |
| UV501VW | October 2016 | 15.6" IPS FHD (1920×1080) or IPS UHD (3840×2160) | Intel Core i7-6700HQ | Intel HD Graphics 530 + NVIDIA GeForce GTX 960M | DDR4 2133 MHz SDRAM, 8 GB, upgradeable to 16 GB | 128/256GB SATA SSD, or 512 GB PCIe (X4) SSD or 1 TB 5400rpm SATA HDD | 802.11 b/g/n Wi-Fi or 802.11 a/b/g/n/ac Wi-Fi and Bluetooth 4.0 | | 60 Wh, 4-cell battery or 96 Wh 6-cell battery | 2.06 kg (4-cell) or 2.27 kg (6-cell) | 383 x 255 x 20.6 (4-cell) 383 x 255 x 21.3 (6-cell) | 1 × 3.5mm audio jack 4 × USB 3.0 1 × HDMI 1 × Thunderbolt 1 × SD card reader 1 × AC adapter plug | |
ZenBook Pro x50 series
| UX550VD | | 15.6" IPS FHD (1920×1080) or IPS UHD (3840×2160), optional touchscreen | 7th Gen Intel Core: i5-7300HQ; i7-7700HQ | Intel HD Graphics 630 + NVIDIA GeForce GTX 1050 | DDR4 2400 MHz SDRAM, 8/16 GB | 256/512 GB PCIe (X2) SSD or 512 GB/1 TB PCIe SSD | 802.11 a/b/g/n/ac Wi-Fi and Bluetooth 4.2 | | 73Wh, 8-cell battery | 1.8 kg | 365 x 251 x 18.9 | 2 x USB-C with USB 10Gbps and Thunderbolt 2 x USB-A with USB 5Gbps 1 x HDMI 1 x Combo audio jack 1 x microSD Card reader | |
| UX550VE | | 15.6" IPS FHD (1920×1080) or IPS UHD (3840×2160), optional touchscreen | 7th Gen Intel Core: i5-7300HQ; i7-7700HQ | Intel HD Graphics 630 + NVIDIA GeForce GTX 1050 Ti | DDR4 2400 MHz SDRAM, 8/16 GB | 256/512 GB PCIe (X2) SSD or 512 GB/1 TB PCIe SSD | 802.11 a/b/g/n/ac Wi-Fi and Bluetooth 4.2 | | 73Wh, 8-cell battery | 1.8 kg | 365 x 251 x 18.9 | 2 x USB-C with USB 10Gbps and Thunderbolt 2 x USB-A with USB 5Gbps 1 x HDMI 1 x Combo audio jack 1 x microSD Card reader | |
ZenBook Pro x80 series
| UX480FD | July 2018 | 14" IPS FHD (1920×1080) | 8th Gen Intel Core: i5-8265U; i7-8565U | Intel UHD Graphics 620 + NVIDIA GeForce GTX 1050 Max-Q | DDR4 2400 MHz SDRAM, 8/16 GB | 128/256GB SATA SSD or 256/512 GB PCIe (X2) SSD or 1 TB PCIe (X4) SSD | 802.11 a/b/g/n/ac Wi-Fi and Bluetooth 5.0 | | 70Wh, 4-cell battery | 1.6 kg | 323 x 225 x 17.9 | 1 x USB-C with USB 10Gbps and Thunderbolt 3 1 x USB-A with USB 10Gbps 1 x Type-A USB 2.0 1 x HDMI 1 x Combo audio jack 1 x AC adapter plug | |
| UX580GE | September 2018 | 15.6" IPS FHD (1920×1080) or IPS UHD (3840×2160) | 8th Gen Intel Core: i5-8300H; i7-8750H; i9-8950HK | Intel UHD Graphics 620 + NVIDIA GeForce GTX 1050 | DDR4 2400 MHz SDRAM, 8/16 GB | 256/512GB PCIe (X2) SSD or 512 GB/1 TB PCIe SSD | 802.11 a/b/g/n/ac Wi-Fi and Bluetooth 5.0 | | 71Wh, 8-cell battery | 1.88 kg | 365 x 241 x 18.9 | 2 x USB-C with USB 10Gbps and Thunderbolt 3 2 x USB-A with USB 10Gbps 1 x HDMI 1 x Combo audio jack 1 x MicroSD card slot 1 x AC adapter plug | |
| UX580GD | September 2018 | 15.6" IPS FHD (1920×1080) or IPS UHD (3840×2160) | 8th Gen Intel Core: i5-8300H; i7-8750H; i9-8950HK | Intel UHD Graphics 620 + NVIDIA GeForce GTX 1050 Ti | DDR4 2400 MHz SDRAM, 8/16 GB | 256/512GB PCIe (X2) SSD or 512 GB/1 TB PCIe SSD | 802.11 a/b/g/n/ac Wi-Fi and Bluetooth 5.0 | | 71Wh, 8-cell battery | 1.88 kg | 365 x 241 x 18.9 | 2 x USB-C with USB 10Gbps and Thunderbolt 3 2 x USB-A with USB 10Gbps 1 x HDMI 1 x Combo audio jack 1 x MicroSD card slot 1 x AC adapter plug | |
Zenbook Pro14 OLED
| UX6404VI | January 2023 | 14.5" 2.8K 120 Hz OLED display | 13th gen Intel® Core™ i9 processor | NVIDIA® GeForce RTX™ 4070 Laptop GPU | 16GB memory with 32 GB SODIMM | 1TB M.2 NVMe™ PCIe® 4.0 Performance SSD 2TB M.2 NVMe™ PCIe® 4.0 Performance SSD | Wi-Fi 6E(802.11ax) (Triple band) 2*2 + Bluetooth 5.3 Wireless Card | Smart Amp Technology Built-in speaker Built-in array microphone harman/kardon (Premium) with Cortana voice-recognition support | 76WHrs, 4S1P, 4-cell Li-ion | 1.65 kg (3.64 lbs) 1.60 kg (3.53 lbs) | 32.18 x 22.33 x 1.79 ~ 1.79 cm (12.67" x 8.79" x 0.70" ~ 0.70") | 1x USB-C with USB 10Gbps and display / USB PD 1x USB-A with USB 10Gbps 1x Thunderbolt 4 with support for display / power delivery (data speed up to 40Gbps) 1x HDMI 2.1 FRL 1x 3.5mm Combo Audio Jack 1x DC-in SD 4.0 card reader | Windows 11 Pro - ASUS recommends Windows 11 Pro for business |
| UX6404VV | January 2023 | 14.5" 2.8K 120 Hz OLED display | 13th gen Intel® Core™ i9 processor | NVIDIA® GeForce RTX™ 4060 Laptop GPU | 16GB memory with 32 GB SODIMM | 1TB M.2 NVMe™ PCIe® 4.0 Performance SSD 512GB M.2 NVMe™ PCIe® 4.0 SSD | Wi-Fi 6E(802.11ax) (Triple band) 2*2 + Bluetooth 5.3 Wireless Card | Smart Amp Technology Built-in speaker Built-in array microphone harman/kardon (Premium) with Cortana voice-recognition support | 76WHrs, 4S1P, 4-cell Li-ion | 1.65 kg (3.64 lbs) 1.60 kg (3.53 lbs) | 32.18 x 22.33 x 1.79 ~ 1.79 cm (12.67" x 8.79" x 0.70" ~ 0.70") | 1x USB-C with USB 10Gbps and display / USB PD 1x USB-A with USB 10Gbps 1x Thunderbolt 4 with support for display / power delivery (data speed up to 40Gbps) 1x HDMI 2.1 FRL 1x 3.5mm Combo Audio Jack 1x DC-in SD 4.0 card reader | Windows 11 Pro - ASUS recommends Windows 11 Pro for business |

=== Zenbook Duo (2019–present) ===
| Model | Release date | Display Matte | Processor | Graphics adapter | Memory | Secondary storage | Wireless | Battery | Audio | Unit weight | Dimensions (Width × Height × Thickness) | Peripheral connections | Operating System |
ZenBook Duo x81 series
| ZenBook Duo UX481FL | May 2019 | 14" IPS FHD (1920 × 1080) + 12.6" FHD (960 × 1080) ScreenPad Plus | Up to Intel Core i7 processor | Intel HD graphics + NVIDIA GeForce MX250 | 2133 MHz LPDDR3 SDRAM, 8/16 GB | 256/512GB PCIe (X2) SSD or 1 TB PCIe (X4) SSD | 802.11 a/b/g/n/ac/ax Wi-Fi and Bluetooth 5.0 | 70Wh, 4-cell battery | | 1.5 kg | 323 x 223 x 19.9 | 1 x USB-C with USB 10Gbps 1 x USB-A with USB 10Gbps 1 x USB-A with USB 5Gbps 1 x HDMI 1 x Audio combo jack 1 x MicroSD card reader 1 x DC-in | |
| ZenBook Pro Duo UX581GV | May 2019 | 15.6" OLED UHD (3840 × 2160) + 14" FHD (3840 × 1100) ScreenPad Plus | 9th Gen Intel Core: i7-9750H; i9-9980HK | Intel UHD Graphics 630 + NVIDIA RTX 2060 | 2666 MHz DDR4 SDRAM, 8/16/32 GB | 256/512GB PCIe (X2) SSD or 1 TB PCIe (X4) SSD | 802.11 a/b/g/n/ac/ax Wi-Fi and Bluetooth 5.0 | 71Wh, 8-cell or 62 Wh, 8-cell (fast-charging) | | 2.5 kg | 359 x 246 x 24 | 1 x USB-C with USB 40Gbps and Thunderbolt 3 2 x USB-A with USB 10Gbps 1 x HDMI 1 x Audio combo jack 1 x DC-in | |
| Zenbook Duo UX481FA | 2020 | 14" IPS FHD (1920 × 1080) (touch screen or non-touch screen) + 12.65" FHD (1920 × 515) ScreenPad Plus | 10th Gen Intel Core: i5-10210U processor; i7-10510U processor; i7-10710U processor | Intel UHD Graphics 620 | 2133 MHz LPDDR3 SDRAM, 8/16 GB | 256/512GB PCIe (X2) SSD or 1 TB PCIe (X4) SSD | 802.11 a/b/g/n/ac/ax Wi-Fi and Bluetooth 5.2 | 70Wh, 4S1P (4 in series 1 in parallel) 4-cell battery | | 1.5 kg (3.31 lbs) 1.65 kg (3.64 lbs) | 323 x 223 x 19.9 cm (12.72" x 8.78" x 0.78" ~ 0.78") | 1 x USB-C 3.2 Gen 2 with USB 10Gbps 1 x USB-A 3.2 Gen 2 with USB 10Gbps 1 x USB-A 3.2 Gen 1 with USB 5Gbps 1 x HDMI 1.4 1 x Audio combo jack 1 x MicroSD card reader 1 x DC-in | Windows 10 Pro |
Zenbook Duo
| Zenbook DUO UX8406MA | January 2024 | Up to dual 14" 3K 120 Hz OLED NanoEdge touchscreens | Up to Intel® Core™ Ultra 9 processor (Series 2) with NPU | Intel® Arc™ Graphics | 16/32GB LPDDR5X on board Max Total system memory up to:16/32GB | 2TB M.2 NVMe™ PCIe® 4.0 SSD 1TB M.2 NVMe™ PCIe® 4.0 SSD 512GB M.2 NVMe™ PCIe® 4.0 SSD | Wi-Fi 6E(802.11ax) (Triple band) 2*2 + Bluetooth 5.3 Wireless Card | 75WHrs, 4S1P, 4-cell Li-ion | Smart Amp Technology Built-in speaker Built-in array microphone harman/kardon (Premium) with Cortana support | 1.65 kg (3.64 lbs) Weight of system: 1.35 kg Weight of keyboard: 0.30 kg | 31.35 x 21.79 x 1.46 ~ 1.99 cm (12.34" x 8.58" x 0.57" ~ 0.78") | 1x USB-A with USB 5Gbps 2x Thunderbolt 4 with support for display / power delivery (data speed up to 40Gbps) 1x HDMI 2.1 TMDS 1x 3.5mm Combo Audio Jack Support XG MobileGC34 | Windows 11 Pro - ASUS recommends Windows 11 Pro for business |
| Zenbook DUO UX8406UA | January 2024 | Up to dual 14" 3K 120 Hz OLED NanoEdge touchscreens | Up to Intel® Core™ Ultra 9 processor (Series 2) with NPU | Intel® Arc™ Graphics | 16/32GB LPDDR5X on board Max Total system memory up to:16/32GB | 1TB M.2 NVMe™ PCIe® 4.0 SSD 2TB M.2 NVMe™ PCIe® 4.0 SSD | Wi-Fi 7(802.11be) (Tri-band)2*2 + Bluetooth 5.4 Wireless Card | 75WHrs, 4S1P, 4-cell Li-ion | Smart Amp Technology Built-in speaker Built-in array microphone with Cortana support | 1.65 kg (3.64 lbs) Weight of system: 1.35 kg Weight of keyboard: 0.30 kg | 31.35 x 21.79 x 1.46 ~ 1.99 cm (12.34" x 8.58" x 0.57" ~ 0.78") | 1x USB-A with USB 5Gbps 2x Thunderbolt 4 with support for display / power delivery (data speed up to 40Gbps) 1x HDMI 2.1 TMDS 1x 3.5mm Combo Audio Jack Support XG MobileGC34 | Windows 11 Pro - ASUS recommends Windows 11 Pro for business |
| Zenbook DUO UX8407AA | January 2026 | Dual 14 inch, OLED, 16:10 aspectratio, touch, with an anti-refection layer,Lumina Pro OLED 3K 2880 x1800 px,48-144HZ VRR, 1000-NITS PEAK HDR, 100% DCI-P3 colors | Intel Panther Lake Core Ultra, up to Core Ultra X9 388H, with NPU | Intel Arc Graphics / Intel Graphics | Up to 32GB LPDDR5-9600 | 2TB M.2 NVMe™ PCIe® 4.0 SSD 1TB M.2 NVMe™ PCIe® 4.0 SSD 512GB M.2 NVMe™ PCIe® 4.0 SSD | Wi-Fi 7(802.11be) 2*2 + Bluetooth 5.4 Wireless Card | 99WHrs, 4S1P, 4-cell Li-ion | Built-in array microphone Built-in speaker Smart Amp Technology, with Cortana support | 1.65 kg (3.64 lbs) | 31.01 x 20.86 x 1.96 ~ 2.34 cm (12.21" x 8.21" x 0.77" ~ 0.92") | 2x Thunderbolt 4 with support for display / power delivery (data speed up to 40Gbps) 1x USB-A with USB 10Gbps, 1x HDMI 2.1 FRL | Windows 11 Pro Windows 11 Home - ASUS recommends Windows 11 Pro for business. |

=== Zenbook S (2018–present) ===
| Model | Release date | Display Matte | Processor | Graphics adapter | Memory | Secondary storage | Wireless | Battery | Audio | Unit weight | Dimensions (Width × Height × Thickness) | Peripheral connections | Operating System |
ZenBook S UX391
| UX391UA | August 2018 | 13.3" IPS FHD (1920 × 1080) or IPS UHD (3840 × 2160) | 8th Gen Intel Core: i5-8250U; i7-8550U | Intel UHD Graphics 620 | 8/16GB 2133 MHz LPDDR3 | 256 GB SATA SSD or 512 GB/1 TB PCIe SSD | 802.11 a/b/g/n/ac Wi-Fi and Bluetooth 4.2 | 50 Wh, 4-cell | | 1 kg (anti-glare display), 1.05 kg (glossy display) | 311 x 213 x 12.9 | 1 x 3.5mm combo audio jack 2 x USB-C with USB 10Gbps and Thunderbolt 1 x USB-C with USB 5Gbps | |
| UX391FA | Early 2019 | 13.3" IPS FHD (1920 × 1080) or IPS UHD (3840 × 2160) | 8th Gen Intel Core: i5-8265U; i7-8565U | Intel UHD Graphics 620 | 8/16GB 2133 MHz LPDDR3 | 256/512 GB/1 TB PCIe SSD | 802.11 a/b/g/n/ac Wi-Fi and Bluetooth 5.0 | 50 Wh, 4-cell | | 1 kg (anti-glare display), 1.05 kg (glossy display) | 311 x 213 x 12.9 | 1 x 3.5mm combo audio jack 2 x USB-C with USB 10Gbps and Thunderbolt 1 x USB-C with USB 5Gbps | |
ZenBook S UX392
| UX392FA | February 2019 | 13.9" IPS FHD (1920 × 1080) | 8th Gen Intel Core: i5-8265U; i7-8565U | Intel UHD Graphics 620 | 8/16GB 2133 MHz LPDDR3 | 256/512 GB/1 TB PCIe SSD | 802.11 a/b/g/n/ac Wi-Fi and Bluetooth 5.0 | 50 Wh, 3-cell | | 1.1 kg | 316 x 195 x 12.9 | 1 x 3.5mm combo audio jack 2 x USB-C with USB 10Gbps and Thunderbolt 1 x USB-A with USB 10Gbps 1 x microSD card slot | |
| UX392FN | February 2019 | 13.9" IPS FHD (1920 × 1080) | 8th Gen Intel Core: i5-8265U; i7-8565U | Intel UHD Graphics 620 + NVIDIA GeForce MX150 | 8/16GB 2133 MHz LPDDR3 | 256/512 GB/1 TB PCIe SSD | 802.11 a/b/g/n/ac Wi-Fi and Bluetooth 5.0 | 50 Wh, 3-cell | | 1.1 kg | 316 x 195 x 12.9 | 1 x 3.5mm combo audio jack 2 x USB-C with USB 10Gbps and Thunderbolt 1 x USB-A with USB 10Gbps 1 x microSD card slot | |
ZenBook S UX393
| UX393 | December 2020 | 13.9" IPS FHD (3300 x 2200) Touch screen | Intel Core i7-1065G7 | Intel Iris Plus Graphics | 16GB LPDDR4X | 1TB M.2 NVMe™ PCIe® 3.0 SSD | Dual-band WiFi 802.11ax (WiFi 6), Bluetooth 5.0 | 67WH, 4-cell | | 1.25 kg | 306 x 224 x 14.9 | 1x USB-A with USB 5Gbps 2x Thunderbolt 3 supports display / power delivery Micro SD card reader | |
| UX393 | December 2020 | 13.9" IPS FHD (3300 x 2200) Touch screen | Intel Core: i5-1135G7; i7-1165G7 | Intel Iris Plus Graphics | 8/16GB LPDDR4X | 512 MB/1 TB M.2 NVMe™ PCIe® 3.0 SSD | Dual-band WiFi 802.11ax (WiFi 6), Bluetooth 5.0 | 67WH, 4-cell | | 1.35 kg | 306 x 224 x 15.7 | ... + 1 x HDMI 1.4 | |
Zenbook S13 OLED
| UX5304MA | April 2023 | 13.3” 3K OLED HDR NanoEdge display | Up to Intel® Core™ Ultra 7 Processor | Intel® Graphics | 16/32GB LPDDR5X on board Max Total system memory up to:16/32GB | 1TB M.2 NVMe™ PCIe® 4.0 SSD 512GB M.2 NVMe™ PCIe® 4.0 SSD | Wi-Fi 6E(802.11ax) (Triple band) 2*2 + Bluetooth 5.3 Wireless Card | 63WHrs, 2S2P, 4-cell Li-ion | Smart Amp Technology Built-in speaker Built-in array microphone harman/kardon (Premium) with Cortana voice-recognition support | 1.00 kg (2.20 lbs) | 29.62 x 21.63 x 1.09 ~ 1.18 cm (11.66" x 8.52" x 0.43" ~ 0.46") | 1x USB-A with USB 10Gbps 2x Thunderbolt 4 with support for display / power delivery (data speed up to 40Gbps) 1x HDMI 2.1 TMDS 1x 3.5mm Combo Audio Jack | Windows 11 Pro - ASUS recommends Windows 11 Pro for business |
| UX5304VA | April 2023 | 13.3” 3K OLED HDR NanoEdge display | Up to Intel® Core™ Ultra 7 Processor | Intel® Iris Xe Graphics *Intel Iris Xᵉ Graphics is only available in models with Intel® Core™ i5/i7/i9 processors with up to 80 graphics execution units (EUs) and dual-channel memory. | 8/16/32GB LPDDR5 on board Max Total system memory up to:8/16/32GB | 1TB M.2 NVMe™ PCIe® 4.0 Performance SSD 512GB M.2 NVMe™ PCIe® 4.0 Performance SSD 1TB M.2 NVMe™ PCIe® 3.0 SSD 1TB M.2 NVMe™ PCIe® 4.0 SSD 512GB M.2 NVMe™ PCIe® 4.0 SSD 512GB M.2 NVMe™ PCIe® 4.0 SSD, 8G eMMC 1TB M.2 NVMe™ PCIe® 3.0 SSD, 8G eMMC | Wi-Fi 6E(802.11ax) (Triple band) 2*2 + Bluetooth 5.3 Wireless Card | 63WHrs, 2S2P, 4-cell Li-ion | Smart Amp Technology Built-in speaker Built-in array microphone harman/kardon (Premium) with Cortana voice-recognition support | 1.00 kg (2.20 lbs) | 29.62 x 21.63 x 1.09 ~ 1.18 cm (11.66" x 8.52" x 0.43" ~ 0.46") | 1x USB-A with USB 10Gbps 2x Thunderbolt 4 with support for display / power delivery (data speed up to 40Gbps) 1x HDMI 2.1 TMDS 1x 3.5mm Combo Audio Jack | Windows 11 Pro - ASUS recommends Windows 11 Pro for business |
Zenbook S16
| UX5606SA | May 2024 | 16:10 3K ASUS Lumina OLED display | Up to Intel® Core™ Ultra 9 processor (Series 2) | Intel® Arc™ Graphics | Up to 32 GB LPDDR5x 8533 MHz RAM | Up to 2 TB PCIe® Gen 4 SSD | Wi-Fi 7(802.11be) (Tri-band)2*2 + Bluetooth 5.4 Wireless Card | 78WHrs, 2S2P, 4-cell Li-ion | Smart Amp Technology Built-in speaker Built-in array microphone harman/kardon (Premium) | 1.50 kg (3.31 lbs) | 35.36 x 24.30 x 1.19 ~ 1.29 cm (13.92" x 9.57" x 0.47" ~ 0.51") | 1x USB-A with USB 10Gbps 2x Thunderbolt 4 with support for display / power delivery (data speed up to 40Gbps) 1x HDMI 2.1 TMDS 1x 3.5mm Combo Audio Jack SD 4.0 card reader | Windows 11 Pro - ASUS recommends Windows 11 Pro for business |
| UM5606WA | May 2024 | 16:10 3K ASUS Lumina OLED display | Up to AMD Ryzen™ AI 9 HX 370 processor | AMD Radeon™ 890M Graphics AMD Radeon™ 880M Graphics | Up to 32 GB LPDDR5x 7500 MHz RAM | Up to 2 TB PCIe® Gen 4 SSD | Wi-Fi 7(802.11be) (Tri-band)2*2 + Bluetooth 5.4 Wireless Card | 78WHrs, 2S2P, 4-cell Li-ion | Smart Amp Technology Built-in speaker Built-in array microphone harman/kardon (Premium) | 1.50 kg (3.31 lbs) | 35.36 x 24.30 x 1.19 ~ 1.29 cm (13.92" x 9.57" x 0.47" ~ 0.51") | 1x USB-A with USB 10Gbps 2x USB-C with USB 40Gbps and USB PD 1x HDMI 2.1 TMDS 1x 3.5mm Combo Audio Jack SD 4.0 card reader | Windows 11 Pro - ASUS recommends Windows 11 Pro for business |
| UM5606KA | May 2024 | 16:10 3K ASUS Lumina OLED display | Up to AMD Ryzen™ AI 9 HX 370 processor | AMD Radeon™ Graphics | Up to 32 GB LPDDR5x 7500 MHz RAM | Up to 2 TB PCIe® Gen 4 SSD | Wi-Fi 7(802.11be) (Tri-band)2*2 + Bluetooth 5.4 Wireless Card | 78WHrs, 2S2P, 4-cell Li-ion | Smart Amp Technology Built-in speaker Built-in array microphone | 1.50 kg (3.31 lbs) | 35.36 x 24.30 x 1.19 ~ 1.29 cm (13.92" x 9.57" x 0.47" ~ 0.51") | 1x USB-A with USB 10Gbps 2x USB-C with USB 40Gbps and USB PD 1x HDMI 2.1 TMDS 1x 3.5mm Combo Audio Jack SD 4.0 card reader Support XG MobileGC34 | Windows 11 Pro - ASUS recommends Windows 11 Pro for business |
Zenbook S14
| UX5406SA | September 2024 | 16:10 3K OLED display with 4 speakers | Up to Intel® Core™ Ultra 9 processor (Series 2) | Intel® Arc™ Graphics | Up to 32 GB LPDDR5x 8533 MHz RAM | Up to 1 TB PCIe® Gen 4 SSD | Wi-Fi 7(802.11be) (Triple band) 2*2 + Bluetooth 5.4 Wireless Card | 72WHrs, 2S2P, 4-cell Li-ion | Smart Amp Technology Built-in speaker Built-in array microphone harman/kardon (Premium) | 1.20 kg (2.65 lbs) | 31.03 x 21.47 x 1.19 ~ 1.29 cm (12.22" x 8.45" x 0.47" ~ 0.51") | 1x USB-A with USB 10Gbps 2x Thunderbolt 4 with support for display / power delivery (data speed up to 40Gbps) 1x HDMI 2.1 TMDS 1x 3.5mm Combo Audio Jack | Windows 11 Pro - ASUS recommends Windows 11 Pro for business |

=== Zenbook Fold (2022–present) ===
| Model | Release date | Display Matte | Processor | Graphics adapter | Memory | Secondary storage | Wireless | Battery | Audio | Unit weight | Dimensions (Width × Height × Thickness) | Peripheral connections | Operating System |
|---|---|---|---|---|---|---|---|---|---|---|---|---|---|
Zenbook 17 Fold OLED
| UX9702AA | August 2022 | 17-inch, glossy, 60 Hz, 2,560 x 1,920 OLED display | 12th Gen Intel Core i7-1250U | Intel Xe 0.95G Hz | 16GB LPDDR5 5,200 MHz RAM / 1TB PCIe 4.0 x 4 NVMe M.2 SSD | 1TB PCIe NVMe | Wi-Fi 6E, Bluetooth 5.3 | 75Wh | Built-in speaker | 1.5 kg + 300g ErgoSense Bluetooth keyboard | 378.5 x 287.6 x 8.7mm (unfolded), 287.6 x 189.3 x 17.4mm (folded) | 2x Thunderbolt 4 1 x 3.5mm audio | Windows 11 Pro |

=== Zenbook A (2025-present) ===
| Model | Release date | Display Matte | Processor | Graphics adapter | Memory | Secondary storage | Wireless | Battery | Audio | Unit weight | Dimensions (Width × Height × Thickness) | Peripheral connections | Operating System |
|---|---|---|---|---|---|---|---|---|---|---|---|---|---|
Zenbook A14
| UX3407QA | January 2025 | 16:10 FHD OLED display | Up to Snapdragon® X Elite processor | Qualcomm® Adreno™ GPU | Up to 32 GB LPDDR5x 8533 MHz RAM | Up to 1 TB PCIe® Gen 4 SSD | Wi-Fi 6E(802.11ax) (Triple band) 2*2 + Bluetooth 5.3 Wireless Card | 70WHrs, 3S1P, 3-cell Li-ion 48WHrs, 3S1P, 3-cell Li-ion | Smart Amp Technology Built-in speaker Built-in array microphone | 0.98 kg (2.16 lbs) 0.90 kg (1.98 lbs) | 31.07 x 21.39 x 1.34 ~ 1.59 cm (12.23" x 8.42" x 0.53" ~ 0.63") | 1x USB-A with USB 10Gbps 2x USB-C with USB 40Gbps and USB PD 1x HDMI 2.1 TMDS 1x 3.5mm Combo Audio Jack | Windows 11 Pro - ASUS recommends Windows 11 Pro for business |
| UX3407RA | January 2025 | 16:10 FHD OLED display | Up to Snapdragon® X Elite processor | Qualcomm® Adreno™ GPU | Up to 32 GB LPDDR5x 8533 MHz RAM | Up to 1 TB PCIe® Gen 4 SSD | Wi-Fi 7(802.11be) (Triple band) 2*2 + Bluetooth 5.4 Wireless Card | 70WHrs, 3S1P, 3-cell Li-ion | Smart Amp Technology Built-in speaker Built-in array microphone | 0.98 kg (2.16 lbs) | 31.07 x 21.39 x 1.34 ~ 1.59 cm (12.23" x 8.42" x 0.53" ~ 0.63") | 1x USB-A with USB 10Gbps 2x USB-C with USB 40Gbps and USB PD 1x HDMI 2.1 TMDS 1x 3.5mm Combo Audio Jack | Windows 11 Pro - ASUS recommends Windows 11 Pro for business |
Zenbook A16
| UX3607OA | January 2026 | 16.0-inch, 3K OLED 16:10 aspect ratio, Touch screen / Non-touch screen | Snapdragon® X2 Elite Extreme X2E96100 Snapdragon® X2 Elite Extreme X2E94100 | Qualcomm® Adreno™ GPU | 48GB LPDDR5X Memory on Package Max Total system memory up to:48GB | Up to 2TB M.2 NVMe™ PCIe® 4.0 SSD | Wi-Fi 7(802.11be) (Triple band) 2*2 + Bluetooth 5.4 Wireless Card | 70WHrs, 3S1P, 3-cell Li-ion | Built-in array microphone Built-in speaker Smart Amp Technology | 1.30 kg (2.87 lbs) 1.20 kg (2.65 lbs) | 35.35 x 24.24 x 1.38 ~ 1.65 cm (13.92" x 9.54" x 0.54" ~ 0.65") | 2x USB-C with USB 40Gbps and USB PD 1x USB-A with USB 10Gbps, 1x 3.5mm Combo Audio Jack 1x HDMI 2.1 TMDS, SD 4.0 card reader | Windows 11 Pro Windows 11 Home - ASUS recommends Windows 11 Pro for business |
| UX3607QA | January 2026 | 16.0-inch, WUXGA (1920 x 1200) OLED 16:10 aspect ratio 3K (2880 x 1800) OLED 16:10 aspect ratio Non-touch screen | Snapdragon® X X1 26 100 Processor | Qualcomm® Adreno™ GPU | 32GB LPDDR5X on board 16GB LPDDR5X on board Max Total system memory up to:32GB /16GB | Up to 2TB M.2 NVMe™ PCIe® 4.0 SSD | Wi-Fi 6E(802.11ax) (Triple band) 2*2 + Bluetooth 5.3 Wireless Card | 70WHrs, 3S1P, 3-cell Li-ion | Built-in array microphone Built-in speaker Smart Amp Technology | 1.10 kg (2.43 lbs) | 35.35 x 24.24 x 1.38 ~ 1.65 cm (13.92" x 9.54" x 0.54" ~ 0.65") | 2x USB-C with USB 40Gbps and USB PD 1x USB-A with USB 10Gbps, 1x 3.5mm Combo Audio Jack 1x HDMI 2.1 TMDS, SD 4.0 card reader | Windows 11 Pro Windows 11 Home - ASUS recommends Windows 11 Pro for business |

== Reception and criticism ==
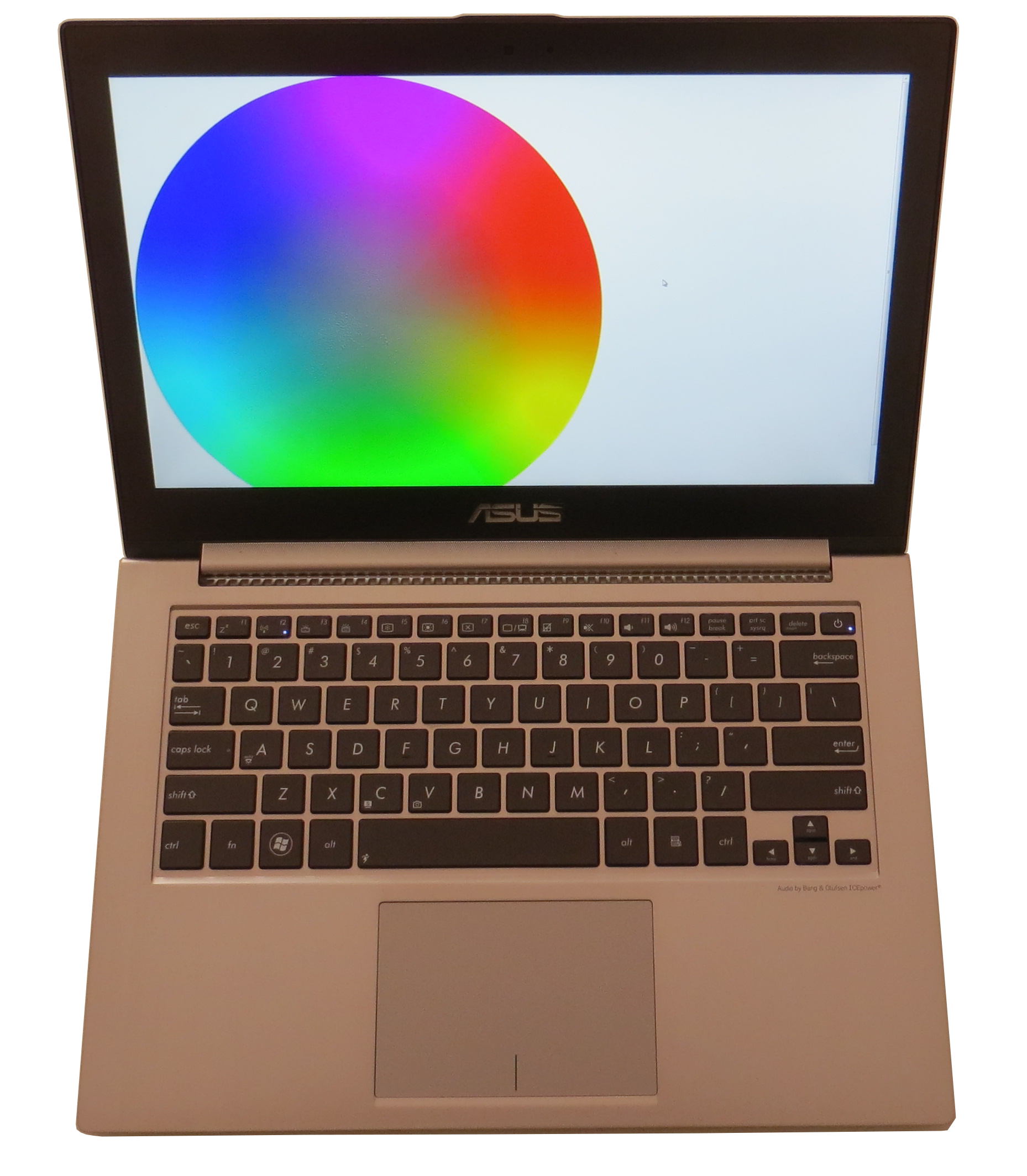
The UX31A keyboard is backlit and has greater key travel than the first generation.

The first official ZenBooks, the ZenBook UX21E and UX31E drew comparisons to the MacBook Air and it was regarded as an "excellent rival" by CNET reviewer Andrew Hoyle. Other aspects of the laptops that reviewers liked were the Bang and Olufsen speakers, fast boot times due to Asus' BIOS design and the speed of general tasks within the operating system resulting from the SSD and Sandy Bridge processors. However, the screens drew criticism for their poor contrast ratio, colour accuracy and less than perfect viewing angle, although they were praised for their brightness and the sharpness of the UX31's screen. Reviewers also noted the shallow key-press of the metal keyboard and lack of backlighting, a feature that Asus did not have time to implement before shipping.

ZenBooks have been generally well received due to their chassis design and appearance as well as the high quality screens used in later models. However, the touchpad software was found to be erratic, particularly on the early models and some of the models received criticism for their high prices. Some models (such as the UX32) suffer from lockdown when the lithium polymer battery cell gets drained or discharged below its recommended threshold, for example if the device is left on and unattended. The result is that the charger will fail to recharge the battery even when plugged in, leaving the machine in a near-complete unresponsive off-state. The machine can often be revived by pressing the power-on key for 10 seconds, whereupon it will start recharging.

=== Earlier models ===
The new screens on the ZenBook Prime were highly praised by reviewers when considering brightness, contrast ratio, viewing angle and colour accuracy, the improvements over previous models being put down to the switch from TN to IPS displays. The keyboard also garnered praise for the increased backlighting and improved key travel while the Intel Wi-Fi controller was found to perform better than the Qualcomm used in the first generation of Zenbooks. The Zenbook Primes still received some criticism: the latest version of the touchpad was acknowledged as an improvement over the original Zenbooks, but still irritating, and the sound quality was found to be worse than that with the first generation. Despite these issues, the overall reaction was positive: the UX31A was called "today's best ultrabook" and "the best ultrabook out there" at the time of release.

The ZenBook UX32VD was well received for similar reasons to the Zenbook Prime. The screen, chassis and keyboard again garnered praise although the inclusion of a discrete GPU was noted as a major selling point. The hybrid drive attracted criticism for its slow performance and the same touchpad issues that the Zenbook Prime had were still present. SLR Lounge criticised the slow hybrid drive and 4 GB of RAM, but suggested replacing them as the option is available, noting that it was an option not often offered on ultrabooks.

Numerous Zenbook models with resolution specifications of QHD+ (3200 × 1800) and 4K (3840 × 2160) utilize Pentile RG/BW displays, which are regarded by some as a "shady practice" and "sort of cheating".

As a cheaper option the ZenBook UX32A was praised by Chris Martin of PC Advisor for being "a more affordable luxury", retaining the "premium feel" of the Zenbook range but at a lower price point. The aluminium chassis, which is identical to the UX32VD to keep costs down, was widely acclaimed for its strength and build quality. By contrast, the Sandy Bridge chip, a previous-generation part at the time of sale, was outlined as a detraction as was the lower battery life compared to the UX31E. Although the screen used was a TN panel and of a lower resolution than the UX32VD or UX31A, it was considered an acceptable compromise for the price. The screen has a matte finish and relatively high brightness which Notebook Check's reviewer, Christian Hepp, found "quite suitable for outdoor use", noting that it had a good contrast ratio but a narrow range of colours.

The ZenBook UX42VS and UX52VS drew criticism for its high price and lack of touch screen, but the screen quality, keyboard and system speed were praised. The battery life was considered acceptable taking into account the form-factor and the discrete GPU, despite it being significantly shorter than the UX31A.

AnandTech reviewer Jason Inofuentes found the touch screen to be so superior to the touchpad that he stopped using the touchpad altogether in his trial of a Zenbook Touch at the Asus launch event. Chris Griffith of The Australian found that the screen of the UX31A responded well and that the Windows 8 gestures worked predictably, his only criticism being the high price.

=== Recent models ===
The ZenBook UX430 is commonly reported to suffer from significant coil whine issues.
