= Vodafone Mobile Connect USB Modem =

Wi-Fi modem

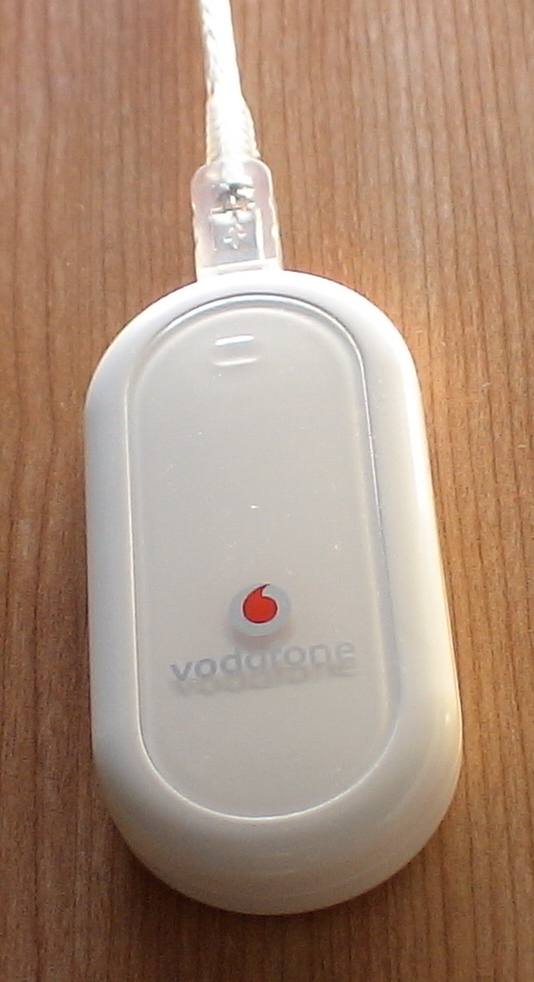
Vodafone 3G USB modem

Vodafone Mobile Connect USB Modem branded as Vodem is a product of Vodafone that connects to the broadband internet. It is connected to the computer via USB which makes the product usable to virtually any computer, desktop or laptop.

Huawei E220, K3806 and K3772H Vodem sticks are manufactured by Huawei for Vodafone. The K3772Z Vodem stick (note the 'Z' suffix) is manufactured by ZTE for Vodafone.

== Drivers and installation ==
Using this USB modem, customers are able to access 3G broadband services, from many types of computer. The software self installs from the modem, reducing the need for technical expertise from users. Vodafone's Mobile Connect Lite software self-installs through a Windows's auto-start feature.
It uses the executable : VodafoneUSBPP.exe

This device is also supported in Linux, using Vodafone Mobile Connect Card driver for Linux, which can be downloaded from the Vodafone Global website

If this modem is to be used on Windows Vista, it must first be updated to the latest firmware on a Windows XP system, as the modem does not function on Windows Vista with the default firmware.

== Speed ==
Using HSDPA technology, it offers download speeds of up to 3.6 Mbit/s and upload speeds of up to 384 kbit/s, which depends on Vodafone's network on each of the countries offering 3G services. Unfortunately, speed degrades rapidly when getting to the fringe of coverage or inside buildings where signal strengths fades. This commonly results in almost unusable speeds of 6.6Kbs for receiving and 68.8 Kbs for sending, which is a symptom even in Central London locations. There are however commercial solutions available to increase signal strength by attaching external antennas to the Huawei E220.

When outside of 3G broadband coverage, customers will automatically be able to access the web using Vodafone's existing GPRS services.

Most Vodems and Vodem sticks are of reaching 7.2 Mbit/s.
The original Huawei E220 supports up to 3.6 Mbit/s, and can connect up to 7.2 Mbit/s with a firmware upgrade.
The Vodafone K5150 Vodem is a CAT4 4G device, capable of download speeds of up to 150 Mbit/s on a 4G LTE network and 42.2 Mbit/s with a dual-carrier network.
The Vodafone Pocket WiFi is capable of download speeds of up to 150 Mbit/s on a 4G LTE network and 50 Mbit/s with a dual-carrier network.

== See also ==
- WiMAX
- Wireless modem
