= Nexus Hawk =

The Nexus Hawk 4G is a gateway router linking broadband cellular data, such as CDMA, GSM and Wi-Fi (IEEE 802.11)a, b, g, n) and WAN (such as BGAN Satellite) networks providing enterprises with broadband wireless internet/network data services in mobile and remote environments.

The Nexus Hawk's original development was funded under a DOD (Department of Defense) prime contract. The technology was primarily designed for military use and supports public safety. The Nexus Hawk is currently in use by law enforcement agencies, governmental data infrastructure, commercial fleet, connectivity in and to retail locations, and livery services in Washington, DC.

The device provides secure access to public and private wired and wireless networks including, Sprint (CDMA EVDO Rev A, 1xRTT), Verizon Wireless LTE, CDMA EVDO Rev A 1xRTT, AT&T Wireless 4G, GSM /HSDPA, Telus HSDPA+, CDMA EVDO Rev A 1xRTT, Washington DC EVDO Rev A Regional Wireless Broadband Network (RWBN), non-U.S. cellular networks, and secure WiFi. GPS for applications such as Automatic Vehicle Location (AVL) sometimes commercial referred to as fleet tracking or Geo-Based Dispatch and Navigation. Connectivity to multiple simultaneous WAN via Gigabit Ethernet, USB or WiFi paths with user-selectable order for failover and fail back. Access to 4 simultaneous WANS and GPS. Automatic and persistent network connections. Incorporates 2 USB and 4 PCI-M slots to accommodate future networks such as WiMAX and Public Safety Band), accepts ExpressCard 34mm air cards, PCMCIA CardBus air cards and USB air cards via adapter, Secure Remote Configuration Management, Built in IPsec and OpenVPN and pass through security features, FIPS140-2 SSL Certified Module.

== See also ==
- HSPA
- Huawei E220
