= Huawei E220 =

Modem developed by Huawei

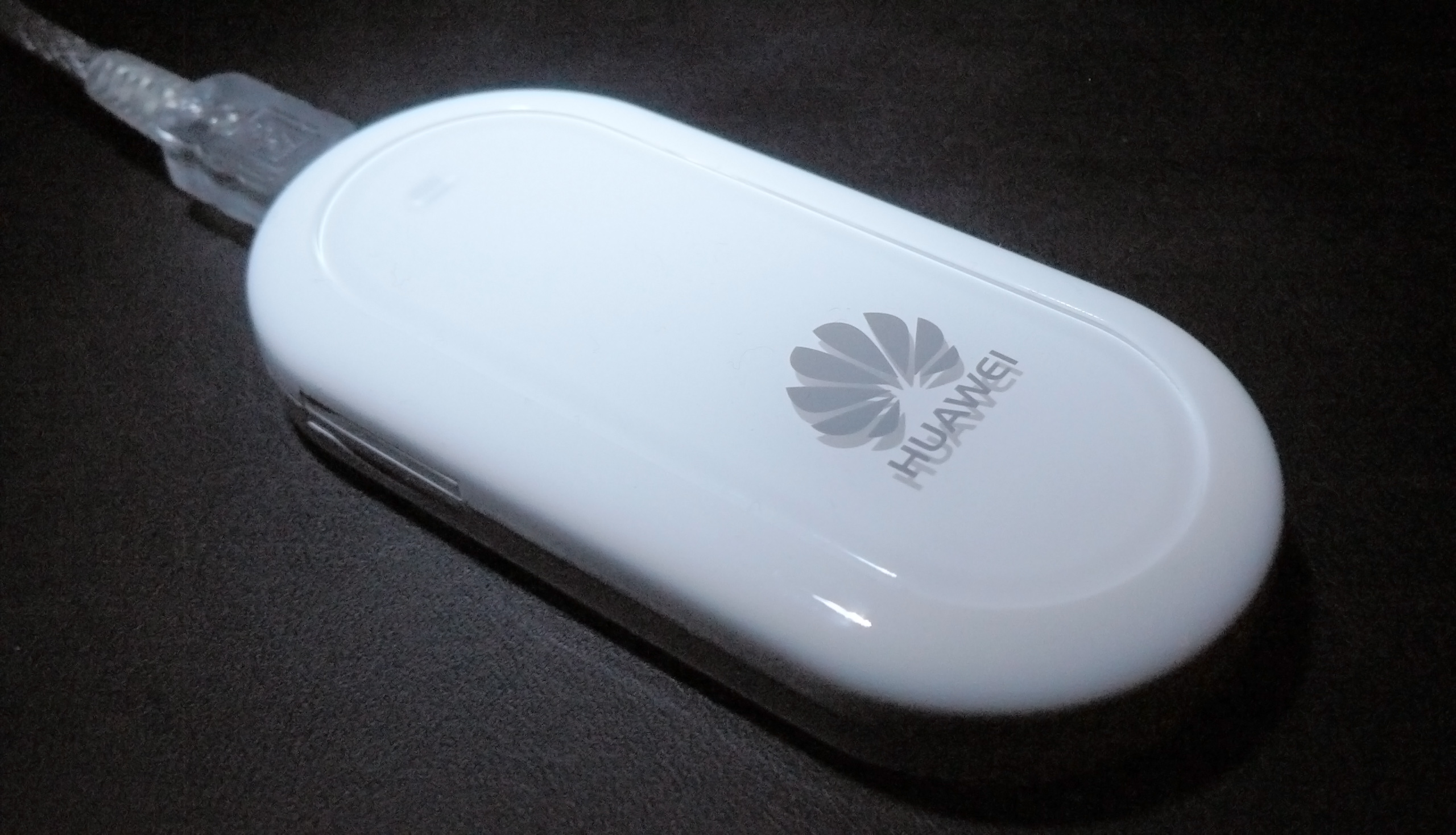
Huawei E220 HSDPA USB modem

The Huawei E220 is a Huawei HSDPA access device (modem) manufactured by Huawei and notable for using the USB interface (USB modem).

Technically it is a modem, USB and (due to the ISO 9660 format) virtual CD-ROM device.

Launched on 21 June 2006, the device is used for wireless Internet access using 3.5G, 3G, or 2G mobile telephony networks. It supports UMTS (including HSDPA), EDGE, GPRS and GSM.

E220 works well with Linux, as support for it was added in Linux kernel 2.6.20 (2007-02-04), but there are workarounds for distributions with older kernels. The card is also supported by Vodafone Mobile Connect Card driver for Linux, and it is possible to monitor the signal strength through other Linux applications.

Most 3G network operators bundle the device with a contract, with some operators simlocking the device. Unlocked and unbranded modems can also be bought from independent suppliers.

== Features ==
The device contains not only the cellular antenna, but also about 22 MB (10 MB on older versions) of storage memory accessible to the operating system as a USB mass storage device formatted as per ISO 9660, thus emulating a CD-ROM drive. In this memory, E220 devices supplied by mobile operators may contain 3G dialer software written by the operator, while Huawei-branded devices contain Huawei's original dialing software, which they call 'Dashboard'. Huawei's Dashboard and updates for it are also available from Huawei's website, or the 11.313.02.00.01 firmware for 7.2 Mbit/s from NetCom (in reality 'flashing' this device means writing a firmware image to its internal flash memory, which is different from "updating the dashboard", which is simply writing a new ISO 9660 disc image to the USB mass storage device that appears in the operating system). Flashing the firmware of this device doesn't change the USB Mass Storage memory used for the operator's software, therefore connection settings (such as APN) will be retained.

When the device is first attached, Windows will automatically run the software stored on it, unless that feature has been turned off in Windows. This feature can be bypassed by pressing the Shift key while attaching the device, or by turning off the autostart feature entirely. It is possible to remove the operator branding by flashing the device with Huawei's Mobile Partner software. Huawei does not publicly release firmware updates for its devices, only Dashboard updates. The standard way of obtaining firmware updates is through the service provider, however some firmware updates are publicly available over the Internet and some users have cross-flashed (i.e. using a firmware provided by service provider "X" with modem supplied by service provider "Y") their modems without trouble.

Updating the modem's Dashboard does not remove or affect the network-lock (that may be in effect with modems purchased subsidized from a service provider) that prevents you from using the modem with any service provider. However updating the modem's firmware may remove this network-unlock or even the opposite, turn a network-unlock free modem into an unlocked one.

== Hardware ==
The E220 connects to the computer with a standard Mini USB cable. The device comes with two cables, one short and one long. The long one has two USB A interfaces, one used for data and power and the other optionally only for assistance power in case the computer is not able to provide the full 500 mA (milliamperes) required for the device to work from one USB interface only. If the connection is frequently disrupted or is unstable (or usable at slow speeds only), the two plug USB cable should be used instead.

The E220 antenna is internal; the USB cable does not act as an antenna. The external antenna connector is not accessible without opening the device (voiding any warranty). It is still possible to connect an external antenna without opening the device and using the (internal) external antenna connector, which together with the use of a high gain antenna like an LPDA or an OMNI booster antenna and an adapter, can considerably improve signal strength. Another cheap and functional way of connecting an external antenna is to open the modem, remove the small internal antenna, and solder a UMTS-antenna cable onto the board, though this invalidates the warranty.

== Software ==
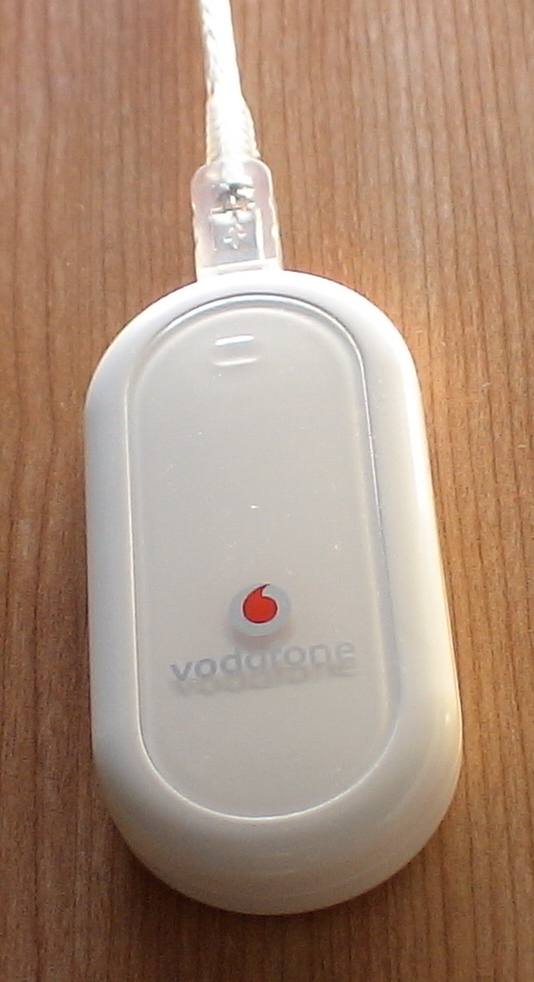
Vodafone 3G USB modem

The Huawei E220 includes its own Windows software in its internal memory, which self-installs through the Windows's auto-start feature and can be flashed (overwritten) by the end user. The standard software by Huawei is called Mobile Partner and is indicated by the code UTPS.

Some network operators selling the E220, however, replace Huawei's software with their own, which often is software-locked (albeit not SIM-locked) to work only with the operator's own network. End-users can use also third-party open source software PyHumod or freeware MWconn.

Since the release of Windows 7 users have reported a number of issues that require a firmware upgrade to the modem. Huawei have released new firmware to the operators, who have generally made it available on their websites. The firmware upgrade must be carried out from a machine running Windows XP or Windows Vista and which can see the modem. Once this is complete Windows 7 can see and use the modem.

The following operator(s) are known to replace Huawei's software with their own:

- BASE eplus (Germany),
- BT Business (UK),
- Claro (Americas),
- Dialog Axiata (Sri Lanka),
- Drei (Austria),
- Metfone (Cambodia),
- MTS (Russia),
- Mobilkom Austria (Austria) - uses software from Austrian software vendor mquadr.at for both its brands A1 and Bob.
- Mobily (Saudi Arabia),
- Movistar (Spain, Argentina),
- MTC (Namibia),
- MTN (Uganda),
- MTN SA (South Africa),
- mt:s (Serbia),
- Multilinks TeleKoms (Nigeria),
- Nawras (Oman),
- Optimus Telecomunicações (Portugal),
- Orange Austria,
- Orange Belgium,
- Play Mobile (Poland),
- Safaricom (Kenya),
- Sun Cellular (Philippines),
- Swisscom (Switzerland),
- Telkomsel & Axis (Indonesia) (but not sim-locked),
- Three (Australia, Austria, Italy, UK, Sweden),
- T-Mobile Austria,
- Turkcell (Turkey),
- Visafone (Nigeria),
- VIVA (Kuwait),
- Vodacom SA (South Africa),
- Vodafone - Vodafone puts on its E220 (Vodafone Mobile Connect USB Modem) its Windows Vodafone Mobile Connect Lite software, which is a lighter version of Vodafone Mobile Connect. In Windows it uses the executable VodafoneUSBPP.exe. This device is also supported in Linux, using Vodafone Mobile Connect Card driver for Linux, which can be downloaded from Vodafone Betavine. - Vodafone in New Zealand markets the Huawei D220 as the Vodem. - Vodafone in Fiji markets the Huawei Modem as the Flashnet.
- WIND Greece,
- Zain (Nigeria),
- Zain (Sudan).

=== Operating systems ===
- Microsoft Windows XP, Vista and 7
- Mac OS X v10.2.6 Jaguar or higher
- Linux 2.6.20 or higher. One can use wvdial or NetworkManager with this modem in Linux.
- FreeBSD
- OpenBSD
- OpenSolaris
- AROS Poseidon stack

== Similar modems ==
- HSDPA:
  - ZTE MF620
  - VigSys VM10
  - Huawei E160 (E160E, E160G, E160X, K3565)
  - Huawei E169
- HSUPA:
  - Novatel Ovation MC950D
  - Huawei E270

== See also ==
- Cellular broadband
- Cellular coverage
- Ethernet over USB
- Mobile Broadband Configuration Assistant (MBCA) for NetworkManager.
- Mobile Internet
- NetworkManager
- Nexus Hawk
- SIM cloning
- SMA connector
- wvdial
- Wi-Fi
- WiMAX
