= E220 =

E220 may refer to:

- The E number for sulfur dioxide, a preservative for dried fruits
- Huawei E220, a 2006 USB modem
- Mercedes-Benz E220, a Mercedes-Benz E-Class car
