= QMI =

QMI may refer to:

- QMI press agency, a division of the Canadian media conglomerate Quebecor Media
- Quality Management Institute, a management systems registrar owned by SAI Global
- Quebecor Media Inc., a Canadian media company
- Qualcomm MSM Interface, a proprietary interface
- Q-wave myocardial infarction, an older classification of myocardial infarction
