= Compound device =

A USB compound device contains an embedded USB hub and one or more non-removable USB devices. It may or may not have exposed downstream ports.

The internal USB hub may be a physical IC that connects to other ICs, or the hub and all functions may be implemented in software on a single IC (though it is more common to integrate them as a composite device in this case). Compound devices have separate device addresses assigned to the hub and each downstream function, while composite devices have a single address. The hub's descriptors indicate whether it is part of a compound device or a regular hub with only removable devices.

This arrangement is used by wireless receivers for cordless keyboards and mice (where the mouse and keyboard are separate devices connected to the compound device) and sometimes for printers which have memory card slots.
