= USB hub =

Device that expands a single USB port into several

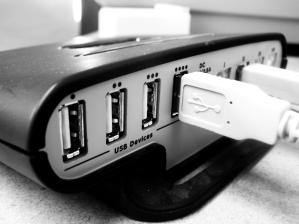
A four-port "long cable" "external box" USB hub

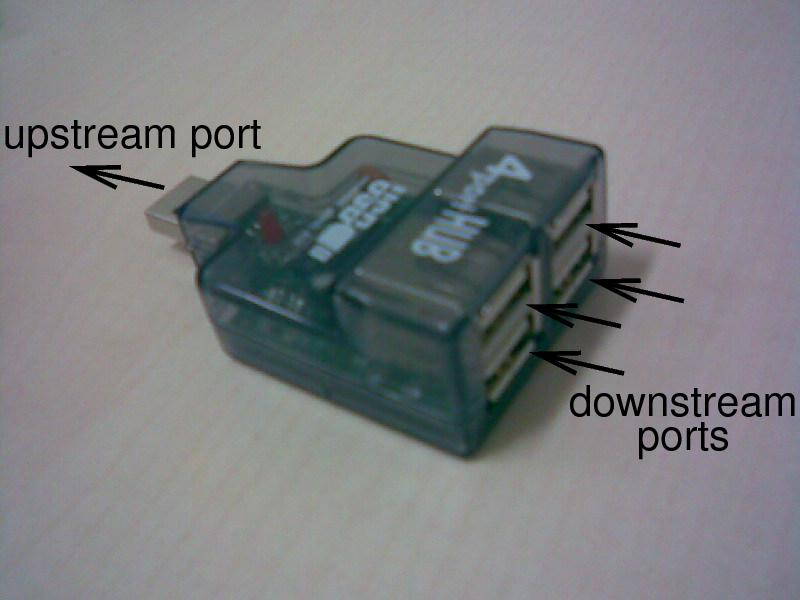
A four-port "compact design" USB hub: upstream and downstream ports shown

A USB hub is a device that expands a single Universal Serial Bus (USB) port into several so that there are more ports available to connect devices to a host system, similar to a power strip. All devices connected through a USB hub share the bandwidth available to that hub.

Physically separate USB hubs come in a wide variety of form factors: from external boxes (looking similar to an Ethernet or network hub), to small designs that can be directly plugged into a USB port (see the "compact design" picture). "Short cable" hubs typically use an integral 6-inch (15 cm) cable to slightly distance a small hub away from physical port congestion and increase the number of available ports.

Almost all modern laptop computers are equipped with USB ports, but an external USB hub can consolidate several everyday devices (like a mouse, keyboard or printer) into a single hub to enable one-step attachment and removal of all the devices.

Some USB hubs may support power delivery (PD) to charge a laptop battery, if self-powered and certified to do so, but may be referred to as a simple docking station due to the similar nature of only needing one connection to charge the battery and connect peripherals. Hubs may feature power switches for individual ports to allow conveniently power cycling unresponsive devices.

== Physical layout ==
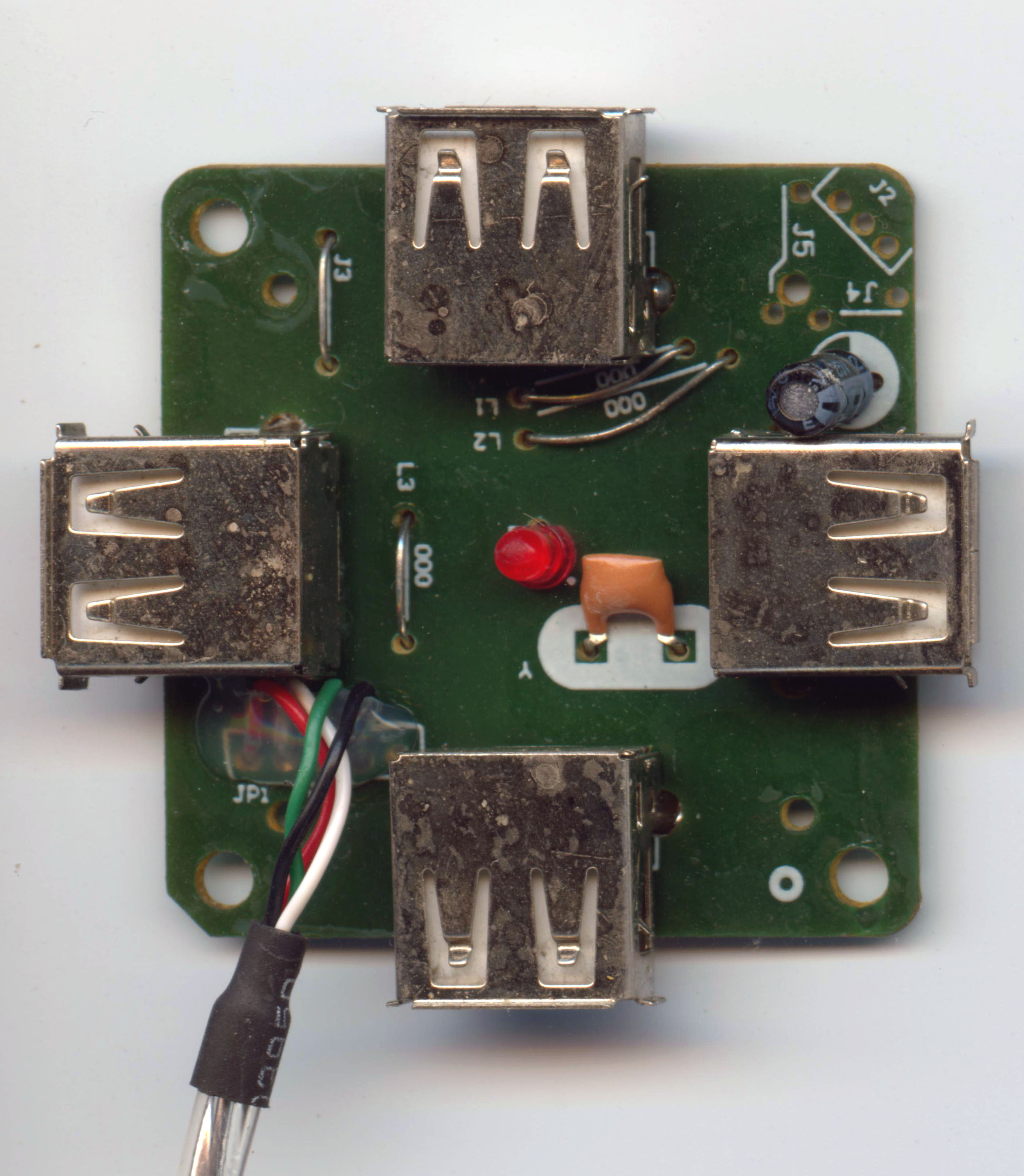
A "star" "short cable" external USB with the plastic casing removed

A USB network is built from USB hubs connected downstream to USB ports, which themselves may stem from USB hubs. USB hubs can extend a USB network to a maximum of 127 ports. The USB specification requires that bus-powered (passive) hubs are not connected in series to other bus-powered hubs.

Depending on vendor and design, USB ports are often closely spaced. Consequently, plugging a device into one port may physically block an adjacent port, particularly when the plug is not part of a cable but is integral to a device such as a USB flash drive. A horizontal array of horizontal sockets may be easy to fabricate, but may cause only two out of four ports to be usable (depending on plug width).

Port arrays in which the port orientation is perpendicular to the array orientation generally have fewer blockage problems. External "Octopus" or "Squid" hubs (with each socket at the end of a very short cable, often around 2 inches (5 cm) long), or "star" hubs (with each port facing in a different direction, as pictured) avoid this problem completely.

=== Length limitations ===
USB cables are limited to 3 metres (10 feet) for low-speed USB 1.1 devices. A hub can be used as an active USB repeater to extend cable length for up to 5 metre (16 feet) lengths at a time. Active cables (specialized connector-embedded one-port hubs) perform the same function, but since they are strictly bus-powered, externally powered USB hubs would likely be required for some of the segments.

== Power ==
Many hubs can operate as either bus powered or self powered hubs. Power equals voltage times current. A USB port that draws 500 mA (0.5 A) at 5 volts is drawing 2.5 watts of power.

In bus-powered USB hubs, each USB port can supply power as well as transfer data. A self-powered hub takes its power from an external power supply unit and can therefore provide full power (up to 500 mA) to every port. Self-powered hubs are usually more expensive than unpowered USB hubs

=== Self-powered hub (active hub) ===
Self-powered hubs can power high-voltage devices such as speakers, printers, and scanners. Self-powered USB hubs are usually more bulky, and more expensive than bus-powered USB hubs.

==== Compatibility ====
There are many non-compliant hubs on the market which announce themselves to the host as self-powered despite really being bus-powered. Equally, there are plenty of non-compliant devices that use more than 100 mA without announcing this fact. These hubs and devices do allow more flexibility in the use of power (in particular, many devices use far less than 100 mA and many USB ports can supply more than 500 mA before going into overload shut-off), but they are likely to make power problems harder to diagnose.

Some self-powered hubs do not supply enough power to drive a 500 mA load on every port. For example, many seven port hubs have a 1 A power supply, when in fact seven ports could draw a maximum of 7 * 0.5 = 3.5 A, plus power for the hub itself. Designers assume the user will most likely connect many low-power devices and only one or two requiring a full 500 mA. On the other hand, the packaging for some self-powered hubs states explicitly how many of the ports can drive a 500 mA full load at once. For example, the packaging on a seven-port hub might claim to support a maximum of four full-load devices.

==== Power source ====
===== USB PD =====
USB multiport adapter setup
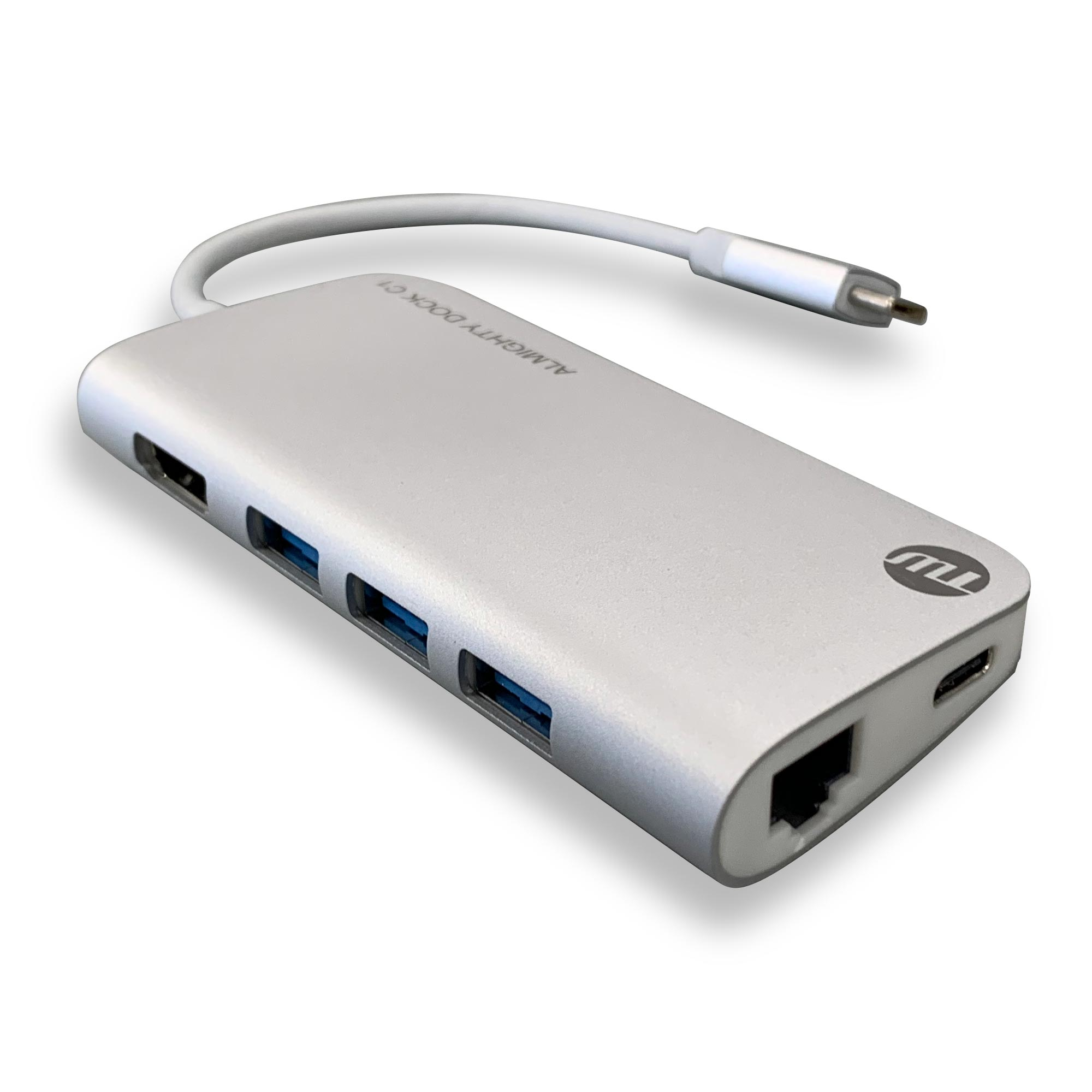
USB multiport adapter: USB-C alt mode cable, USB PD (USB-C) port, a HDMI port, three USB 3.2 ports, an Ethernet port.

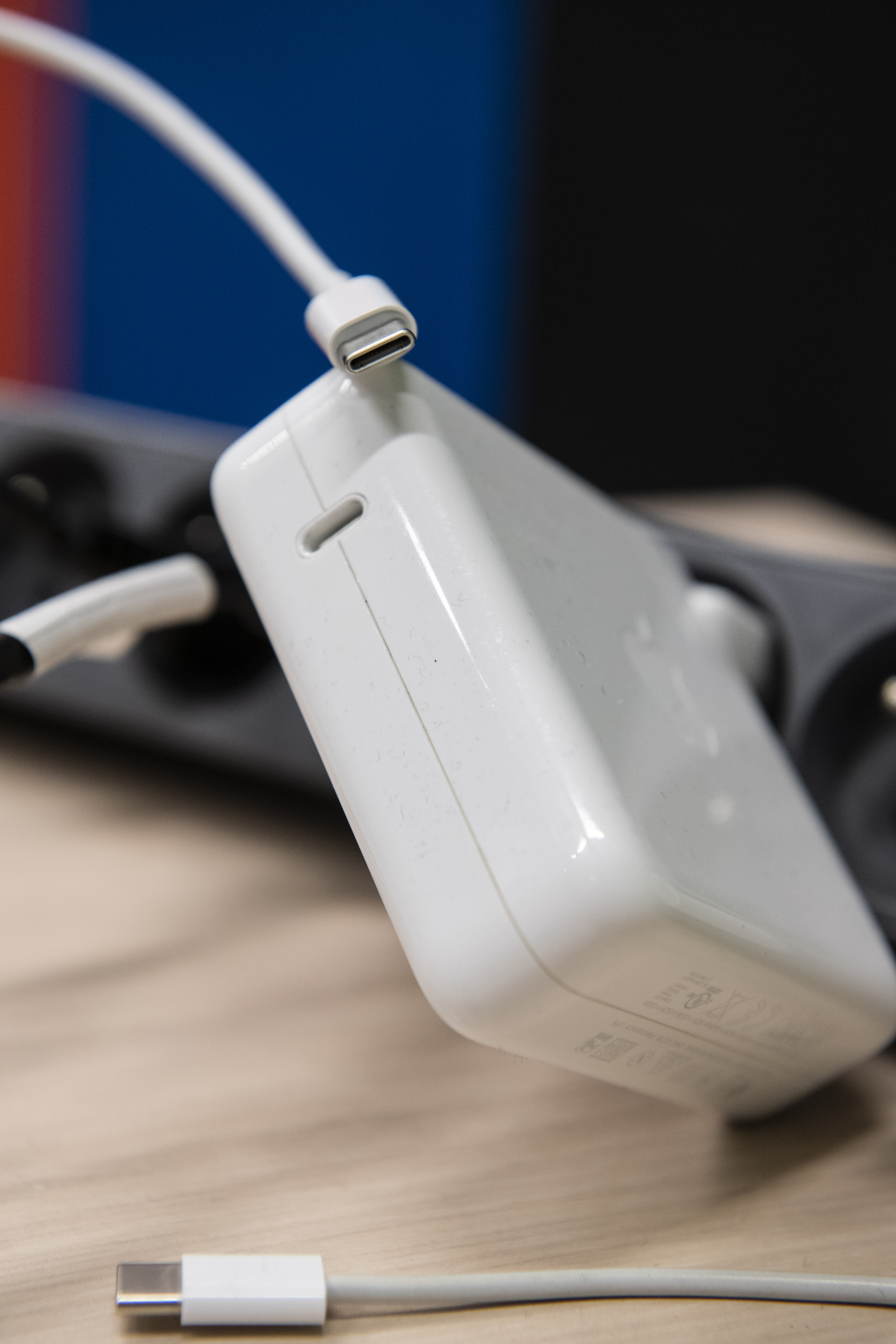
To power a USB multiport adapter and charge a connected mobile device that is connected to it at the same time, a 100 W USB-C PD wall charger is typically sufficient.

Example how to calculate wattage consumption for a USB multiport hub with a USB PD port, and an HDMI port, connected to a smartphone and HDMI:

Input/output	Wattage	Hardware setup
Input	+100 W	100 W wall charger, 100 W USB-C cable. USB Multiport adapter: 100 W USB-C PD port, integrated 100 W USB cable.
Output	-30 W	Smartphone charging: The USB Multiport adapter integrated 100 W USB cable connected to the phone, and the USB-C cable connected to the USB multiport hub PD port, and the wall charger.
Output	-1.5 W	8k HDMI cable connected: USB multiport adapter, and TV.
Remaining available wattage	58.5 W	

===== Electrical plug =====
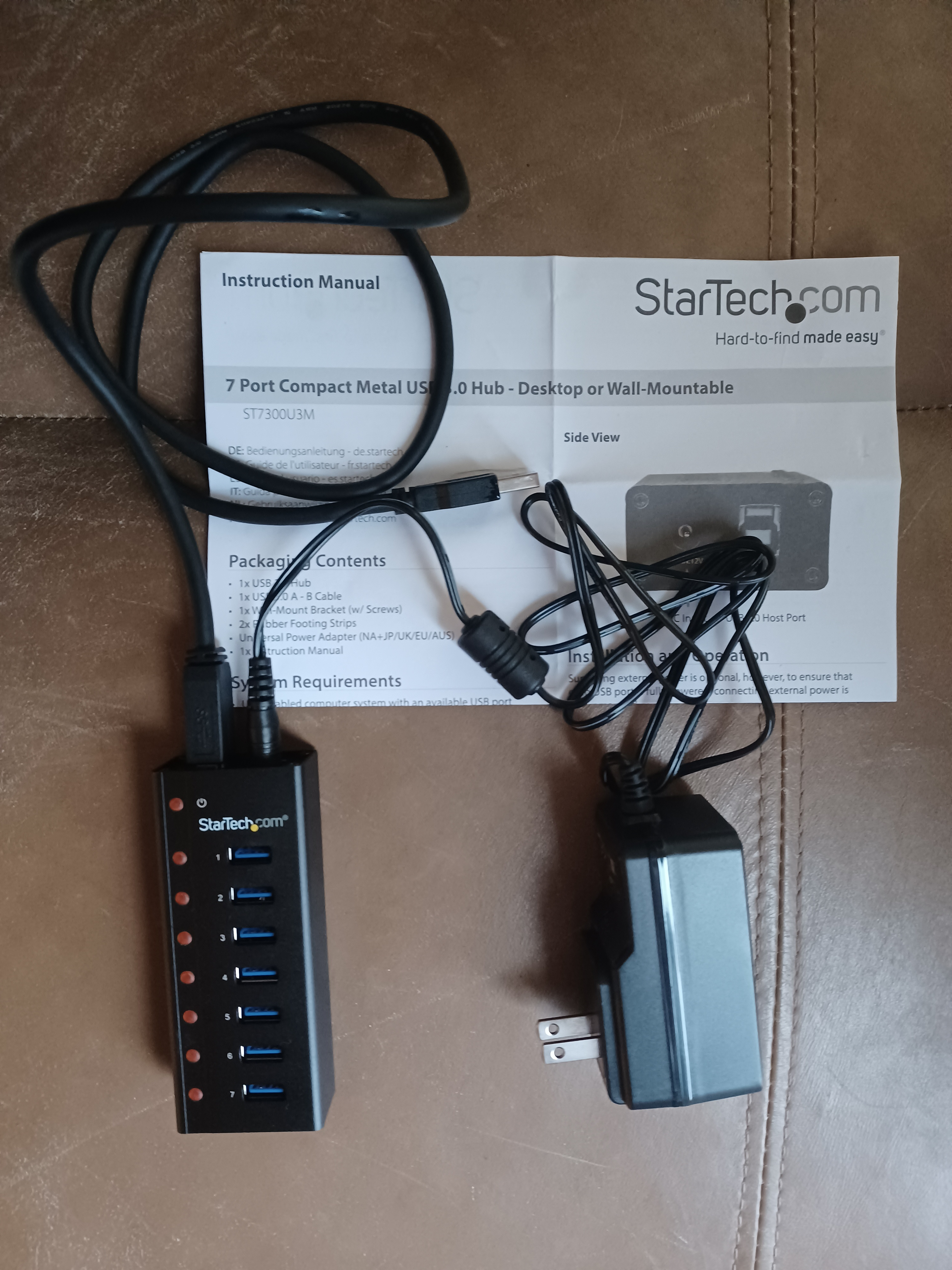
This self-powered USB hub gets power from a wall electrical plug.

=== Bus-powered hub (passive hub) ===
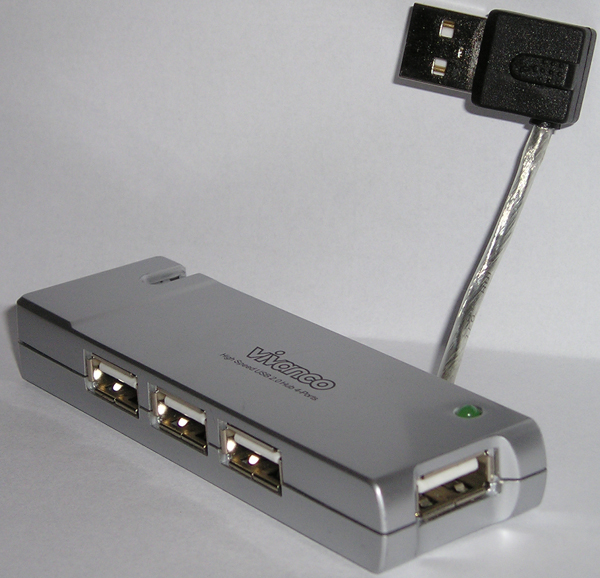
A 4-port USB hub that is bus-powered

A bus-powered hub draws all its power from the host computer's USB interface. It does not need a separate power connection. However, many devices require more power than this method can provide and will not work in this type of hub. It may be desirable to use a bus-powered hub with self-powered external hard-disks, as the hard-disk may not spin down when the computer turns off or enters sleep mode while using a self-powered hub since the hard disk controller would continue to see a power source on the USB ports.

All USB ports operate at 5 volts, but may draw or supply differing amounts of electric current.

==== Limitations ====
A USB's electric current is allocated in units of 100 mA up to a maximum total of 500 mA per port. Therefore, a compliant bus powered hub can have no more than four downstream ports and cannot offer more than four 100 mA units of current in total to downstream devices (since the hub needs one unit for itself). If a device requires more units of current than the port it is plugged into is able to supply, the operating system usually reports this to the user.

=== Dynamic-powered hubs ===
Dynamic-powered hubs are hubs which can work as bus-powered as well as self-powered hubs. They can automatically switch between modes depending on whether a separate power supply is available or not. While switching from bus-powered to self-powered operation does not necessarily require immediate renegotiations with the host, switching from self-powered to bus-powered operation may cause USB connections to be reset if connected devices previously requested more power than available in bus-powered mode.

== Speed ==
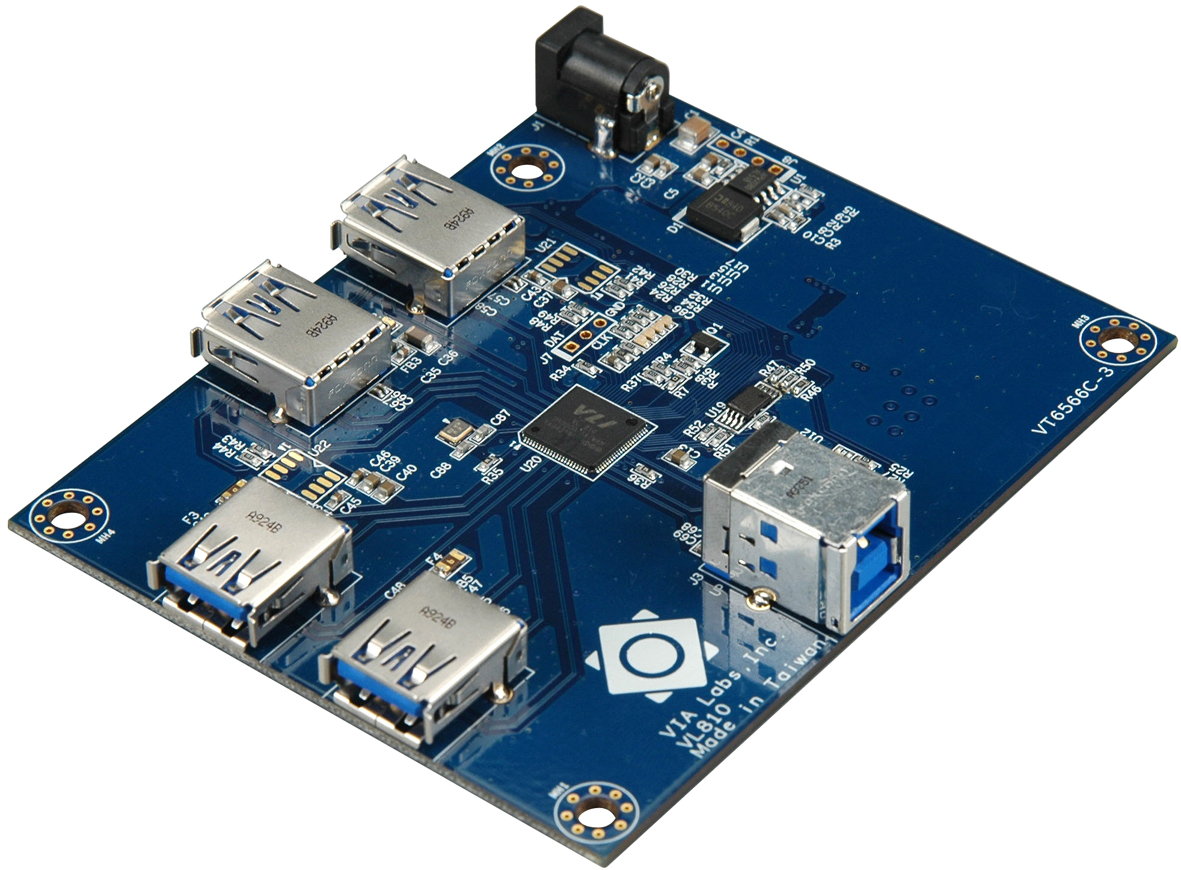
Hub Demo Board from VIA shows all internal components of a hub

To allow USB Hi-Speed (USB 2.0) devices to operate in their fastest mode, all hubs between the devices and the computer must be high-speed. High-speed devices should fall back to USB Full-Speed (USB 1.1) when plugged into a full-speed hub (or connected to an older full-speed computer port). While high-speed hubs can communicate at all device speeds, low- and full-speed traffic is combined and segregated from high-speed traffic through a transaction translator. Each transaction translator segregates lower speed traffic into its own pool, essentially creating a virtual full-speed bus. Some designs use a single transaction translator (STT), while other designs have multiple translators (MTT). Having multiple translators is a significant benefit when one connects multiple high-bandwidth full-speed devices.

It is an important consideration that in common language (and often product marketing), USB 2.0 is used as synonymous with high-speed. However, because the USB 2.0 specification, which introduced high-speed, incorporates the USB 1.1 specification such that a USB 2.0 device is not required to operate at high speed, any compliant full-speed or low-speed device may still be labelled as a USB 2.0 device. Thus, not all USB 2.0 hubs operate at high speed.

With the introduction of USB 3.0 specification it was recommended that manufacturers distinguish USB 3.0 connectors from their USB 2.0 counterparts by using blue (Pantone 300C ) for the Standard-A receptacles and plugs, and use the USB SuperSpeed trident logo.

== Protocol ==
Each hub has exactly one upstream port and a number of downstream ports. The upstream port connects the hub (directly or via other hubs) to the host. Other hubs or devices can be attached to the downstream ports. During normal transmission, hubs are essentially transparent: data received from its upstream port is broadcast to all devices attached to its downstream ports (pictorially described in the USB 2.0 specification in Figure 11–2, Hub Signalling Connectivity). Data received from a downstream port is generally forwarded to the upstream port only. This way, what is sent by the host is received by all hubs and devices, and what is sent by a device is received by the host but not by the other devices (an exception is resume signaling). Downstream routing has been changed in USB 3.0 with the addition of Point to Point routing: A route string sent in the packet header allows a USB 3.0 host to only send a downstream packet to a single destination port, decreasing congestion and power consumption.

Hubs are not transparent when dealing with changes in the status of downstream ports, such as insertion or removal of devices. In particular, if a downstream port of a hub changes status, this change is dealt with in an interaction between the host and this hub; with any hubs between the host and "changed hub" acting as transparent.

To this aim, each hub has a single interrupt endpoint "1 IN" (endpoint address 1, hub-to-host direction) used to signal changes in the status of the downstream ports. When someone plugs in a device, the hub detects voltage on either D+ or D− and signals the insertion to the host via this interrupt endpoint. When the host polls this interrupt endpoint, it learns that the new device is present. It then instructs the hub (via the default control pipe) to reset the port where the new device was plugged in. This reset makes the new device assume address 0, and the host can then interact with it directly; this interaction will result in the host assigning a new (non-zero) address to the device.

== Transaction translator ==
Any USB 2.0 hub that supports a higher standard than USB 1.1 (12 Mbit/s) will translate between the lower standard and the higher standard using what is called a transaction translator (TT). For example, if a USB 1.1 device is connected to a port on a USB 2.0 hub, then the TT would automatically recognize and translate the USB 1.1 signals to USB 2.0 on the uplink. However, the default design is that all lower-standard devices share the same transaction translator and thus create a bottleneck, a configuration known as the single transaction translator. Consequently, multi transaction translators (Multi-TT) were created, which provide more transaction translators such that bottlenecks are avoided. Note that due to the nature of USB 3.0 hubs have separate logic for the USB 3.0 and 2.0 data and therefore report a HUB device for both protocols.

== Electronic design ==
Most USB hubs use one or more integrated controllers (ICs), of which several designs are available from various manufacturers. Most support a four-port hub system, but hubs using 16-port hub controllers are also available in the industry. The USB bus allows seven cascading tiers of ports. The root hub is the first tier, and the last devices are on the seventh tier, allowing five tiers worth of hubs between them. The maximum number of user devices is reduced by the number of hubs. With 50 hubs attached, the maximum number is 127 − 50 = 77.

== See also ==
- USB On-The-Go
