= USB communications device class =

USB device class

USB Communications Device Class ("CDC") (or together, "USB CDC") is a composite Universal Serial Bus device class. It is most commonly used for computer networking devices akin to a network card, providing an interface for transmitting Ethernet or ATM frames onto some physical media. It is also used for modems, serial ports, ISDN, fax machines, and telephony devices that perform regular voice calls.

Devices of this class are also implemented in embedded systems such as mobile phones so that a phone may be used as a modem, fax or network port. The data interfaces are generally used to perform bulk data transfer.

Microsoft Windows versions prior to Windows Vista do not work with the networking parts of the USB CDC, instead using Microsoft's own derivative named Microsoft RNDIS, a serialized version of the Microsoft NDIS (Network Driver Interface Specification). With a vendor-supplied INF file, Windows Vista works with USB CDC and USB WMCDC devices.

== Abstract Control Model ==
The Abstract Control Model (ACM) protocol defined in the CDC specification can be used to implement a general-purpose serial UART. For example, an adapter cable which is USB on one end and RS-232 on the other may present the USB end to the operating system as a CDC-ACM device which uses the operating system's standard CDC-ACM driver. Such an adapter provides a way to upgrade industrial equipment that uses RS-232 such as CNC machinery without changing the equipment's hardware or software. Most USB serial adapters do not use USB's CDC-ACM protocol but rather their own vendor-defined drivers and protocols which support more features, but there are a few adapters such as the Prolific PL2503 and Microchip MCP2200 that do use standard CDC-ACM. Furthermore, CDC-ACM is commonly implemented in software on microcontrollers such as the ESP32 to provide a serial console for configuring and debugging embedded systems.

== See also ==
- List of USB Device Classes
