= Qualcomm MSM Interface =

Proprietary interface by Qualcomm

The Qualcomm MSM Interface is a proprietary interface for interacting with Qualcomm baseband processors and is a replacement for the legacy cellular extensions of the Hayes command set. With mobile chipsets, communication between the application processor and the baseband processor happens through shared memory. On PCs with data cards, QMI is exposed through USB.

== Linux ==
In the Linux kernel, QMI can be used through two mutually exclusive drivers: GobiNet and qmi_wwan. These two drivers take completely different approaches to handle the protocol. GobiNet is a complex proprietary driver which implements within the kernel most of the core protocol logic, while qmi_wwan is part of the upstream kernel and leaves all those tasks to user-space processes, and therefore keeping the kernel driver as small as possible. There are several userspace implementations, such as uqmi on OpenWrt, oFono and libqmi.

== See also ==
- Radio Interface Layer
- QMI - postmarketOS Wiki
