= Catchword (disambiguation) =

A catchword is a word at the bottom of a page in a multi-paged document that anticipates the first word of the following page to assist their proper collation.

Catchword may also refer to:

- Headword, in a dictionary
- Catchword (game show), a British gameshow
- Catchphrase
- Catchword (company), a naming firm that creates names for companies and products.

== See also ==
- Catch phrase (disambiguation)
