= DockPort =

DockPort (originally codenamed Lightning Bolt) is a backward-compatible extension of DisplayPort, adding USB 3.0 and DC power, in addition to DisplayPort's video and audio signalling. Standardised by VESA, it is the first royalty-free industry standard to combine these four interface functions in one connector. DockPort was developed by AMD and Texas Instruments, two member companies of VESA, as a low-cost alternative to Thunderbolt, for use as a docking interface for laptops and other mobile devices.

The Texas Instruments HD3SS2521, as one example, is a DockPort controller that routes DisplayPort and USB 3.0 signals along with power over a standard DisplayPort cable. It was unveiled in 2013, and used as the basis of the final DockPort standard. The docking, for instance, can provide MST hub implementation for multiple displays (through DisplayPort, HDMI, DVI, or D-Sub), a SuperSpeed USB hub, alongside audio and full bandwidth Gigabit Ethernet.

DockPort had little marketshare and a relatively short life. The release of USB-C in 2014 brought the ability to transfer video over a standard data port and as such, it fully supplants DockPort.
