= Catchword (company) =

American creative agency

- Type: Private
- Industry: Naming, Branding
- Founded: 1998
- Headquarters: Oakland, California; US
- Number of locations: 2
- Area served: Worldwide
- Key people: Maria Cypher, Mark Skoultchi
- Services: Company Naming; Product and Service Naming; Naming Strategy; Naming Architecture; Linguistic Analysis; Brand Strategy; Brand Positioning; Preliminary Screening; Brand Research; Brandable Domains; Visual Identity
- Website: catchwordbranding.com

Catchword is an American branding firm founded in 1998. With offices in California and New Jersey, Catchword has created brands such as Upwork, Asana, Versant for NBCUniversal’s cable networks, Popcornmeter for Rotten Tomatoes, and Pippit for ByteDance. In addition to naming, the company provides brand strategy, visual identity, and brandable domain names.

== Corporate history ==
Catchword was founded in May 1998 as a naming agency by Maria Cypher, Laurel Sutton, and Burt Alper. The company initially focused on technology and start-up companies, but later broadened its scope to cover other industries. In January 2001, Mark Skoultchi joined the company to head East Coast operations at its New Jersey office. Since 2014, the company has been headed by Cypher and Skoultchi. In 2022, the company expanded its services and locations to two additional offices in the Denver area and in Calgary, Canada.

== Services ==
Services offered by Catchword include company and product naming, naming strategy and architecture, linguistic analysis, trademark prescreening, brand strategy and positioning, logos and visual identity systems.

Catchword reviews brand names and provides naming and branding tips and insights on its website. The company also runs the online site PopNamer, featuring name games in which the general public submits name ideas for trends, social phenomena and existing products and companies. Catchword also operates The Catchword Accelerator, a marketplace for brandable domain names.

== Work ==
Catchword has created notable company and product names, such as Asana, Versant (NBCU/Comcast), Refreshers (Starbucks), Atlas (Volkswagen), Upwork, Also (Rivian), Popcornmeter (Rotten Tomatoes), Snap'd and Puff'd (Cheez-It), Pippit (ByteDance), Circaloft (The North Face), Maxsight (Moody's), Vuity (Allergan), Medallia, The Bridgespan Group, Keysight (Agilent), ClearCurve and Fibrance (Corning), Optane and Arc (Intel), Maxify (Canon), Vantara (Hitachi), and Nature's Promise (Ahold).

Catchword has created wordmarks and logos for Fullsight, TailFin, Catalyx, and PaperPie.

Catchword’s clients include Aetna, Allergan, Amazon, AMC Networks, Boston Scientific, ByteDance, California State Bar, Canon USA, Capital One, CBRE, The Clorox Company, Corning, Dole Foods, Dunkin' Brands, Fitbit, General Motors, Hitachi, The Home Depot, Intel, McDonald's, PwC, Royal Bank of Canada, Safeway, SEGA, Stack Overflow, Stryker, TikTok, Uber, Unilever, and Wells Fargo.

== Awards and recognition ==
Competition	Year	Award
Hermes Creative Awards	2019, 2020, 2022, 2023, 2024	Gold, Platinum
MarCom Awards	2019, 2020, 2021, 2022, 2023	Gold, Platinum
MUSE Creative Awards	2020, 2021, 2022, 2023, 2025	Gold, Silver
Transform Awards - North America	2018, 2019, 2020, 2022, 2023	Silver, Bronze
London International Awards	2016	Silver
C2A (Creative Communication) Awards	2022, 2023	Winner, Honorable Mention

Catchword has also been recognized by Clutch, DesignRush and Influencer Marketing Hub for several years.
