= Catch phrase (disambiguation) =

A catchphrase is a phrase or expression that is popularized, usually through repeated use.

Catch phrase or catchphrase may also refer to:

- Catch Phrase (game), a word guessing party game by Hasbro
- Catch Phrase (American game show)
  - Burgo's Catch Phrase, an Australian version of the above
  - Catchphrase (British game show), a long-running British game show based on the original American show listed above
- "Catch Phrase", a song by Neil Innes from the album Taking Off

== See also ==
- Catchword (disambiguation)
