= Sony Vaio Z series =

Range of laptops by Sony

Sony has used the Z model naming scheme for its high-end ultraportable notebook computers since 2000. Unlike other Sony models, the Z has always been manufactured in Japan or in the United States for some models (i.e. VGN-Z540). Sony stated that production of the Z series would cease at the end of 2012.

The model numbers for these computers have been PCG-Z (2003), VGN-Z (2008), VPC-Z1 (2010), VPC-Z2 (2011), SVZ (2012).

For differentiation, subsequent Z models proceeded to include high-end screens, CPUs, GPUs and on-board DVD/Blu-ray drives etc.

== Models ==
- Z5xx (US), Z1x (Europe, Asia) — launch models ~ July/August 2008
- Z6xx (US), Z2x (Europe, Asia) — October/November 2008 — minor hardware (CPU, hard disk, RAM) improvements
- no new model (US), Z3x (Europe, Asia) — minor hardware upgrades, as above
- Z7xx (US), Z4x (Europe, Asia) — different colour palm rest, minor hardware improvements
- Z8xx (US), Z5x (Europe, Asia) — new model for Windows 7, minor hardware improvements, enabled VT support in BIOS
- Z11 — 2010 post-CES model. Core i5 and i7 CPU options. SSD-only. Nvidia GT330m GPU.
- Z12 — September 2010, updated iXXX series CPUs, SIM card holder added to North American models
- Z13 — October 2010, added i7-640M CPU, TPM options, keyboard updated.
- Z14 — January 2011, added CTO 1 TB SSD option
- Z21 — July 2011 — Sandy Bridge (2nd Gen Intel Core i7), 0.66-inch thickness, slate battery, external AMD graphics/power dock, lightpeak, USB 3.0, 1.3 Mpx webcam, new Flash SSD

== PCG-Z Original (2003) ==
The original Z featured a color 14.1-inch SXGA TFT display (1400×1050), FireWire (i-Link), two USB 2.0, and a PCMCIA slot and external CD and Floppy Drives, and weighed around 2.1 kg. It had a Pentium M processor ranging from 1.5 to 1.7 GHz. It ran Windows XP and included Sony's DV-Gate software for importing video from DV camcorders.

== VGN-Z (2008 & 2009) ==
In 2008 the first series of VGN-Z was introduced. The second series was introduced in December 2009 as a part of the Intel Centrino 2 launch. They fall into the ultraportable category, with a 13.1-inch screen and 1.47 kg weight (3.4 lb) (dependent on configuration). They were configured with Intel Core 2 Duo CPUs.

Compared with the SZ series, the Z is slightly lighter (200 grams), with a slightly smaller (13.1" vs. 13.3") screen, which was switched from 16:10 to 16:9 widescreen aspect ratio. In comparison to the SZ, which was available only in 1280×800 resolution, the Z series come with a choice (model-dependent) of screens which were 1366×768 and 1600×900 TN panels.

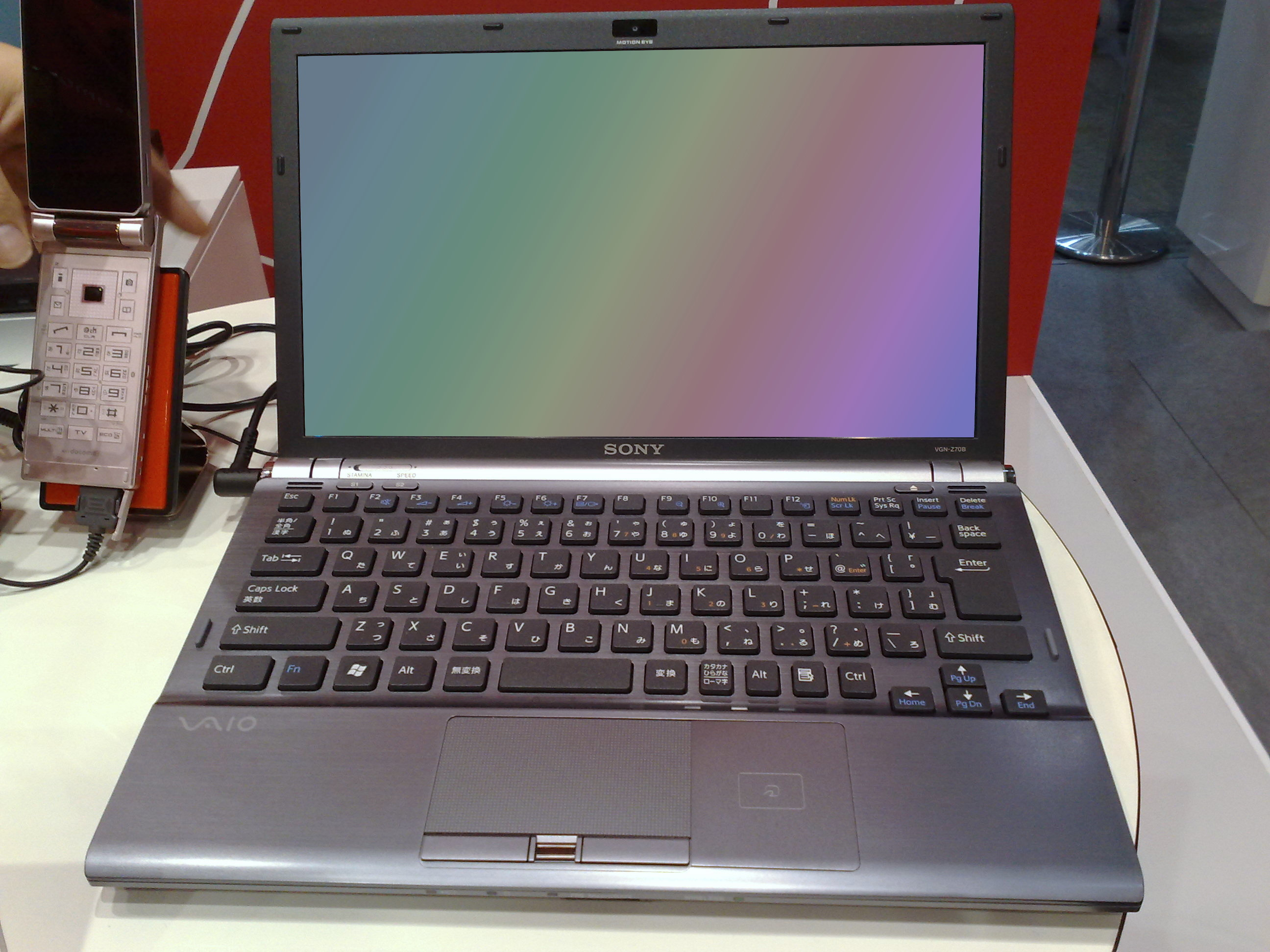
Sony Vaio VGN-Z (Japan)

As with the SZ, the Z has hybrid graphics, featuring an NVIDIA GeForce 9300M GS as well as Mobile Intel 4 Series Express 4500MHD chipsets. The user can switch between the Nvidia (for better graphics performance) and Intel (for longer battery life) via a 2 way switch above the keyboard.

Newer options with the Z series are an integrated Blu-ray Disc drive, built-in HSDPA support and the use of an SSD (including RAID configuration, for better performance) instead of a hard drive for storage.

Other features include a 0.3 megapixel webcam, Bluetooth, SD and Memory Stick reader, FireWire 400 port, fingerprint sensor and Trusted Platform Module support.

As with the SZ series, the Z is equipped with standard, rather than ultra-low voltage (which are slower, but produce less heat and provide better battery life) processors. The CPUs are generally Core 2 Duo P- (mid-voltage) CPUs, but also T- (standard voltage) CPUs. Additionally, the CPU uses a Socket P socket rather than being soldered to the motherboard.

Intel VT-x support was intentionally disabled in the laptop's BIOS, resulting in the use of hacked BIOSes by some users. Sony claimed VT had been disabled for security reasons, but eventually enabled the feature in November 2009. Sony originally shipped Windows Vista with the computer, however they offer options to downgrade to Windows XP or upgrade to Windows 7.

== VPC-Z Update (2010) ==
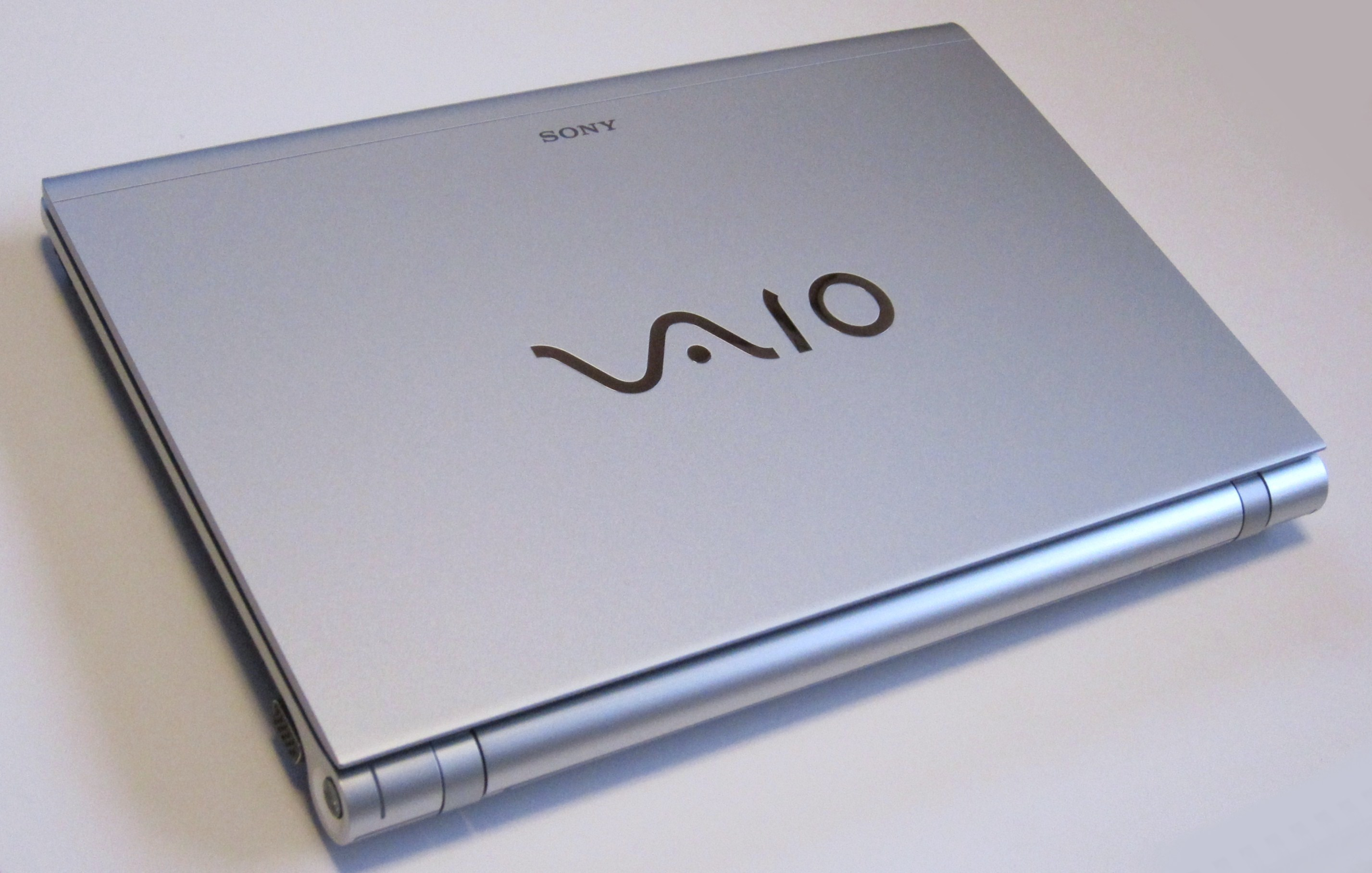
Sony Vaio VPCZ119FJ

The Z series was updated in light of the new Core i5/i7 CPUs from Intel. The new range offers an i5 or i7 (although it is not clear if memory is dual-port or triple-port for the i7; it seems likely to be dual-port, since varying the memory portness in the motherboard by CPU is a big change and because the memory choices remain 2/4/8, rather than changing to 3/6/12), a keyboard backlight, revised chassis and a Blu-ray writer. The first SSD models (VPC-Z1xxx) all use non-standard form-factor drives (due to lack of internal space) sourced from Samsung specifically for the Vaio; they cannot be replaced with standard third party 1.8 or 2.5-inch drives. The SSDs in the refreshed models (VPC-Z12xx, VPC-Z13xx & VPC-Z14xx) can be replaced with 1.8-inch drives from Intel or Crucial, provided the Vaio is a dual-RAID model and not a Quad-RAID model. The caveat is that the outer casing of the Intel or Crucial SSD must be stripped off of the SSDs in order for the SSDs to fit in the Z. At least VPCZ-13 dual-RAID models, custom-ordered in Japan, were shipped with a pair of reduced size Toshiba SSD's, with Micro-SATA connector. The second, third, and fourth refresh models still use proprietary Samsung drives on the Quad-RAID models. In order to replace the SSD drives in a first generation (VPC-Z11xxx) model, or any generation Quad-RAID model, the cable for the SSDs will need to be replaced with Sony part # A-1781-464-A.

Custom Z series models which are built with a hard disk (i.e. non-SSD) and no optical drive are manufactured with a standard 2.5-inch hard disk fitted into the empty optical bay. These models can have the hard disk replaced by a standard 2.5-inch SSD. The adapter in the optical bay expects a 12.7 mm high 2.5-inch drive. At least some 2.5-inch SSD drives (such as the Intel X-25e) are 9 mm models. Proper fitting requires a shim (a piece of cardboard about 4 mm thick cut to the shape of the drive will do).

In these cases, the unit can be opened up by unscrewing every screw on the back. The battery must be removed first and there are five screws covered by the battery; a group of three holding down a plastic rail and two which screw into the back part of the chassis. The two screwed into the chassis need to be removed. Opening the unit up appears not to void the warranty (no stickers broken).

== VPC-Z2 Update (2011) ==
Sony has officially announced its new Ultra-Thin 13-inch Z series laptop the Sony Vaio Z in Europe on June 27, 2011. The highest custom configuration available includes a 2.7 GHz second generation Intel Core i7 (Sandy Bridge) processor, 512 GB SSD in RAID-0 (Newer SATA III Generation 3 SSD), 8 GB 1333 MHz Fixed On-board (Irremovable) DDR3 RAM and a 1920×1080 13.1-inch screen (a 1600×900 screen is also available).

The Z2 is also compatible with Sony's Power Media Dock, which includes an external AMD GPU and a DVD or Blu-ray drive and connects to the laptop through Sony's implementation of the Light Peak Technology.

== SVZ Update (2012) ==
The SVZ has a 15th Anniversary Collector's Edition.

It has nearly the exact same design and weight from VPC-Z2.

The processor changed from a 2nd Gen Intel Core i5 or i7 to a 3rd Gen Intel Core i5 or i7, HM67 chipset to HM77 chipset, HD3000 to HD4000, and the dedicated Power Media Dock GPU changed from an AMD Radeon HD 6650M to an AMD Radeon HD 7670M (exact same model).

=== Technical specifications ===
Sony Vaio Z Series 2012
Component	Japan	Asia Pacific, Middle East & Africa	Europe	North America
Release date	June 2012			
Model Number	SVZ1311AJ	SVZ13115GGXI (Hong Kong Chinese, Simplified Chinese, Arabic, Thai); SVZ13116GGXI (Hong Kong Chinese, Simplified Chinese, Arabic, Thai); SVZ13116GAXI (Arabic); SVZ13115FCB/SVZ13117FCX/SVZ1311S1C (China)	SVZ1311XXX	SVZ131190X
Colours (Carbon Fibre)	Black; Gold; Silver; Carbon Black; Glossy Premium Carbon with the 15th anniversary collectors edition message	Glossy Premium Carbon with the 15th anniversary collectors edition message	Black; Carbon Black; Premium Black with the 15th anniversary collectors edition message	Black; Gold; Carbon Fibre (Canada); Premium Carbon Fibre
Operating system	Windows 7: Home Premium 64 bit; Professional 64 bit; Ultimate 64 bit			
LED-Backlit antireflective display	13.1 in (33 cm) 1600×900 NTSC 100%; 13.1 in (33 cm) Full HD 1920×1080 with 96% Adobe RGB Gamut			13.1" Full HD 1920×1080 with 96% Adobe RGB Gamut; 13.1 in (33 cm) 1600×900 NTSC 100% (Canada)
Processor (CPU)	3rd Gen Intel Core: i3-3110M (2.40 GHz); i5-3210M (2.50 GHz); i5-3320M (2.60 GHz); i7-3520M (2.90 GHz); i7-3612QM (2.10 GHz)	3rd Gen Intel Core: i3-3210M (2.40 GHz) (China); i5-3320M (2.60 GHz) (China); i7-3612QM (2.10 GHz)	3rd Gen Intel Core i5/i7: i5-3210M (2.5 GHz); i7-3612QM (2.10 GHz); i7-3632QM (2.2 GHz)	3rd Gen Intel Core i5/i7: i5-3210M (2.5 GHz); i7-3612QM (2.10 GHz)
Memory (DDR 3 1600 MHz)	4 GB; 6 GB; 8 GB	8 GB; 4 GB (China); 6 GB (China)	4 GB; 8 GB	8 GB; 4 GB (Canada); 6 GB (Canada)
Hard Disk (Storage)	128 GB SATA Gen3 Flash SSD in RAID 0 configuration (2x 64 GB) 256 GB SSD (2x 128 GB); 512 GB SSD (2x 256 GB)	256 GB SATA Gen3 Flash SSD in RAID 0 configuration (2x 128 GB) 128 GB SSD (2x 64 GB) (China); 512 GB SSD (2x 256 GB) (China)	256 GB SATA Gen3 Flash SSD in RAID 0 configuration (2x 128 GB) 128 GB SSD (2x 64 GB) (USA); 512 GB SSD (2x 256 GB)	
Graphics (GPU)	Intel HD 4000 with Intel Wireless Display technology (WiDi); AMD Radeon 7670M @ 1 GB VRAM in the Power Media Dock			
Optical disc drive	None			
Wireless Connectivity	Bluetooth standard Ver. 4.0 + HS; IEEE 802.11 a/b/g/n MIMO 2x2 MIMO 3x3 MIMO 2x2 with WiMax; LTE	Bluetooth standard Ver. 4.0 + HS IEEE 802.11 a/b/g/n MIMO 2x2	Bluetooth standard Ver. 4.0 + HS; IEEE 802.11 a/b/g/n MIMO 2x2 LTE - Download 14.4 Mbit/s / Upload 5.76 Mbit/s (HSDPA, UMTS, EDGE, GPRS); Wireless WAN LTE - Download 100 Mb/S / Upload 50 Mb/S (LTE, HSPA+, UMTS, EDGE, GPRS) (Denmark, Finland, Germany, Norway, Russia & Sweden)	Bluetooth standard Ver. 4.0 + HS IEEE 802.11 a/b/g/n MIMO 2x2
Keyboard	Keyboard; Backlit Keyboard	Backlit Keyboard	Keyboard (English (UK), Finnish, French, German, Italian, Dutch, Danish, Norwegian, Swedish, Russian; Backlit Keyboard	Backlit English (US) Keyboard; Bilingual English (US)/French (Canada)
Webcam	Webcam; Exmor HD 1.3MP Webcam	Exmor HD 1.3MP (1280x1024) Webcam		
Sensors & Security	Ambient Light Sensor TCG ver.1.2 compliant Fingerprint scanner TPM			
I/O (Ports)	1x USB 2.0 with sleep and charge; 1x USB 3.0 with Lightpeak integration for the Power Media Dock; 1x Memory Stick Duo Reader; 1x SD Card Reader; Internal Stereo Speakers with Intel® High Definition Audio, Dolby Home Theater v4, Digital Noise Cancelling, "Clear Phase", "xLOUD"; Internal Microphone; Multi-touch Touchpad with Gesture Support; 1x HDMI; 1x VGA; 1x Gigabit Ethernet; 1x 3.5mm headphone; 1x Docking Station for Sheet Battery			
Noise Cancelling Headphones	Optional	Included		Included (USA); Optional (Canada)
Power Media Dock	Disc Player: CD/DVD Player/Burner; CD/DVD Player/Burner & Blu-ray Disc player; Blu-ray Disc/CD/DVD Player/Burner; All Power Media Docks also possess: AMD Radeon 7670M 1 GB GDDR3 VRAM GPU; 3x USB 2.0; 1x USB 3.0; 1x HDMI; 1x VGA; 1x Gigabit Ethernet			
Battery	4000 mAh Lithium polymer (5.5 hours); Optional 4400 mAh sheet battery (Extra 5.5 hours)			
Dimensions	13 in (33 cm) (L), 8.27 in (21.0 cm) (W), 0.66 in (1.7 cm) (D)			
Weight	1.17 kg (2.6 lb)			

=== Problems ===
Most Sony Vaio models with hybrid Intel-NVIDIA graphics are affected with vast number of bugs present in every accelerated 2D (DX, DS) graphics, 3D graphics and power management of the video-system. Yet, Sony doesn't provide any driver update or fix, leaving customers on their own. Some enthusiast-made Intel-NVIDIA hybrid graphics driver updates solving general gaming performance problems can be found on the Internet, although Sony keeps stating that use of those drivers is the pretext to seize the warranty or extended warranty (damage insurance). While Sony was positioning the Z1x series as equipped with Nvidia Optimus graphics, actually resource sharing between Intel and Nvidia subsystems was never supported, leaving the graphics system in legacy switchable mode. And as far as the provided software doesn't support automatic graphics switching during most multimedia software running, the user is left the only option to switch performance modes manually, making the multimedia software crash or behave unexpectedly.
