= ClearCurve =

Brand of optical fiber cable

ClearCurve is Corning's brand name for a new optical fiber that can be bent around short-radius curves without losing its signal. It is constructed with a conventional fiber on the inside, surrounded by a cladding containing a new nanostructured reflector. ClearCurve is hundreds of times more flexible than conventional optical cable, transmitting high-quality signals even when wrapped around small objects like a pen, where a conventional cable would lose the signal completely.

Although originally introduced to serve the needs of pulling fiber in apartment buildings and other high-density units where conventional fiber is too inflexible, in 2009 Intel announced their intention to use it as the basis of a new computer interconnect system code-named Light Peak. ClearCurve's small size and high bandwidth capabilities offer great improvements over existing copper wiring in this role, and Intel is positioning Light Peak as a truly universal bus that can carry any existing traffic over a single cable.

== Background ==
=== Conventional fiber ===
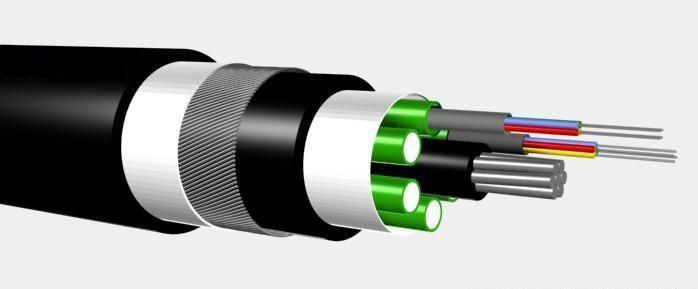
Conventional single-mode long-haul optical fiber cable.

Conventional optical fiber consists of a thin inner cylindrical core of glass or plastic with a similar material layered in a thin coating around it. Slight differences in the index of refraction between the two layers causes total internal reflection, trapping a light beam inside the inner core. This process is limited to a critical angle; when the light beam approaches the interface at a shallow angle most of it will be reflected, but as it gets closer to the critical angle more and more will travel through the interface and be lost.

The critical angle depends on the relative difference in index of refraction, larger differences will increase the critical angle and trap more light. However, changing the index of refraction in most materials generally changes its mechanical properties too, which means that different types of cables are used for different purposes. Cables intended to be highly efficient over long runs are generally less flexible, while those that require higher flexibility are generally only useful for shorter distances. Even cables designed to be flexible, like TOSLINK, are less flexible than a similar sized braided copper cable.

To keep the fibers as straight as possible, most high-performance optical cables use a form of armour that resists tight bending. This is normally a helical winding, similar to BX cable, or a series of straight fibers running parallel to the core. Since the armour is fairly large, the cables normally carry a number of fibers inside. The resulting armoured bundle is then surrounded in an environmental cladding, typically plastic. The bundle is about the size of a conventional power cable found on an electrical appliance, but much less flexible.

=== Fiber to the home ===
Optical cabling has long formed the backbone of major terrestrial networks, delivering signals over long distances. The signals are then converted into other forms at the company end offices, and distributed from there in some other form, typically telephone wiring or coax cable in the case of cable television. The multi-fiber armoured cable is well suited to this role.

Since the 1990s there has been an ongoing effort to supply fiber to the home (FTTH). Using fiber to deliver signals all the way to the home provides the same advantages as it does on the longer hauls, namely much higher bandwidth, lower costs, and less interference with other sources. However, given the deliberate lack of flexibility of the cable, these installations generally end in a utility room where they are converted to copper for distribution within the home.

While this sort of installation is useful for individual dwellings, it is less useful in large multi-unit dwellings. Corning estimates that an apartment installation would require an average of twelve right angle turns between the distribution point and the units. Conventional fiber would lose the signal after one or two such bends, making it useless in this role. As is the case for individual homes, the fiber can be converted to copper for the last section of delivery, but the longer runs demand much higher performance, larger cable. Finding room to run these cables in an existing structure may not be possible.

== ClearCurve ==
ClearCurve fibers are constructed in a fashion similar to existing cables, starting with a traditional glass fiber in the center. ClearCurve then adds a third layer to the sandwich, a plastic sheath that is infused with microscopic reflectors. Light that passes through the conventional interface has a second chance to be reflected back into the center of the fiber. In the corners of tight bends, the reflectors serve to increase the amount of signal retained within the cable, allowing ClearCurve to be hundreds of times more flexible than conventional cables. A thin environmental sheath is added on the outside.

Unlike conventional fibers, ClearCurve does not have to be held straight, and therefore eliminates the armour. Lacking armour, there is no lower limit to the size of a ClearCurve cable, which can be as small as a single fiber, although normally they contain two fibres, one upstream and one down. Two-fiber ClearCurve cables are smaller than the wire on a typical computer mouse, yet the high-performance single-mode versions carry 25 Gbit/s over long lengths.

In a video demonstration, Corning showed a ClearCurve drop cable being wrapped dozens of times around a small metal rod, and suffering almost no signal loss and providing a perfect video feed. A conventional cable wrapped around the same rod completely lost the signal after only two turns.

=== FTTH uses ===
ClearCurve is the end result of a Corning research project looking for products better tailored to the fiber to the home market. Running since 1988 at their Sullivan Park research center in New York, Corning announced ClearCurve at a press event on 19 September 2007 and showed it publicly at the FTTH Conference later that month.

Using ClearCurve, a FTTH installation can use existing armoured cabling to deliver the signal to a utility room, then connect individual ClearCurve cables to the fibers in the bundle for distribution within the building. This sort of installation dramatically simplifies the overall complexity of FTTH wiring in multi-unit dwellings, eliminating both the large coax cabling and the need to convert formats from light to electrical. Users were quickly forthcoming; announced in September, only a month later an official press release announced that Connexion Technologies would be using ClearCurve on 30 November 2007. Since then many additional partners have been announced.

=== Computer bus uses ===
The single-mode fibers used in conversional telecommunications applications have high performance, but require expensive light sources and highly accurate mechanical positioning in order to gather light from them. In comparison, multi-mode have wider cores that are easier to connect to and can be effectively driven by lower-cost devices like solid-state IR lasers or vertical-cavity surface-emitting lasers (VCSELs).

Multi-mode fiber found some uses in high-performance computing applications, notably the Fibre Channel system for high speed disks and some parallel computing interconnection systems. However, the relatively inflexible cables made them less useful in general roles, where braided copper wiring remains widespread. Fiber has found one consumer use, the TOSLINK cable used in digital audio applications. This role uses lower quality multi-mode plastic fibre with limited bandwidth, about 125 Mbit/s, driven by red LEDs. However, advances in computers have demanded ever increasing bandwidth, and modern computer bus systems are quickly reaching their limits. There was some discussion of moving to optical fiber for the USB3 standard, but the decision was made to move ahead with copper.

Corning announced a multi-mode version of ClearCurve cabling on 13 January 2009. It has greater bandwidth than any common copper wiring, and is at least as flexible as copper wiring able to carry the same amount of data. Although it was mentioned only in passing, Intel's new Light Peak interconnection system uses ClearCurve cabling as its basis. Light Peak uses a two-fiber cable running at 10 Gbit/s in both directions. Unlike most optical connection systems, Light Peak is being designed to allow daisy-chaining and supply power through a set of coaxial copper wires.
