= Thunderbolt (interface) =

Computer hardware interface

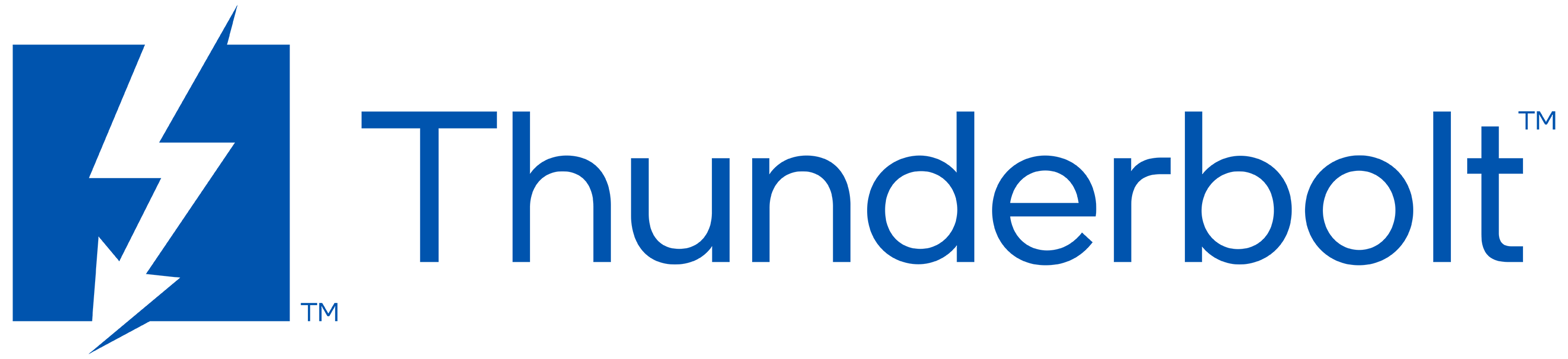

Production history
- Designer: Apple; Intel
- Produced: Since February 24, 2011; 15 years ago
- Superseded: IEEE 1394 (FireWire); ExpressCard

General specifications
- Length: Copper: up to 3 m (9.8 ft); Optical: Up to 60 m (200 ft)
- Width: 7.4 mm plug (8.3 mm receptacle)
- Height: 4.5 mm plug (5.4 mm receptacle)
- Hot pluggable: Yes
- Daisy chain: Up to 6 devices; Thunderbolt 4: Hub support
- External: Yes
- Audio signal: Via DisplayPort protocol or USB-based external audio cards. Supports audio through HDMI converters.
- Video signal: Via DisplayPort protocol
- Pins: Thunderbolt 1 and 2: 20; Thunderbolt 3, 4 and 5: 24
- Connector: Thunderbolt 1 and 2: Mini DisplayPort; Thunderbolt 3, 4, and 5: USB-C

Electrical
- Max. voltage: Thunderbolt 1 and 2: 18 V (bus power); Thunderbolt 3, 4, and 5: 5 V
- Max. current: Thunderbolt 1 and 2: 550 mA (9.9 W max.); Thunderbolt 3, 4, and 5: 3000 mA (15 W)

Data
- Data signal: Yes
- Bitrate: Thunderbolt 1: d2 channels, 10 Gbit/s each (20 Gbit/s in total); Thunderbolt 2: 20 Gbit/s in total; Thunderbolt 3 and 4: 40 Gbit/s bidirectional; Thunderbolt 5: 80 Gbit/s bidirectional
- Protocol: Thunderbolt 1: PCI Express 2.0 × 4, DisplayPort 1.1a; Thunderbolt 2: PCI Express 2.0 × 4, DisplayPort 1.2; Thunderbolt 3: PCI Express 3.0 × 4, DisplayPort 1.2, USB 3.1 Gen 2; Thunderbolt 4: PCI Express 3.0 × 4, DisplayPort 2.0, USB4; Thunderbolt 5: PCI Express 4.0 × 4, DisplayPort 2.1, USB4

Pinout
Pin 1	GND	Ground
Pin 2	'HPD'	Hot plug detect
Pin 3	HS0TX(P)	HighSpeed transmit 0 (positive)
Pin 4	HS0RX(P)	HighSpeed receive 0 (positive)
Pin 5	HS0TX(N)	HighSpeed transmit 0 (negative)
Pin 6	HS0RX(N)	HighSpeed receive 0 (negative)
Pin 7	GND	Ground
Pin 8	GND	Ground
Pin 9	LSR2P TX	LowSpeed transmit
Pin 10	GND	Ground (reserved)
Pin 11	LSP2R RX	LowSpeed receive
Pin 12	GND	Ground (reserved)
Pin 13	GND	Ground
Pin 14	GND	Ground
Pin 15	HS1TX(P)	HighSpeed transmit 1 (positive)
Pin 16	HS1RX(P)	HighSpeed receive 1 (positive)
Pin 17	HS1TX(N)	HighSpeed transmit 1 (negative)
Pin 18	HS1RX(N)	HighSpeed receive 1 (negative)
Pin 19	GND	Ground
Pin 20	DPPWR	Power
- This is the pinout for both sides of the connector, the source side and the sink side. The cable is actually a crossover cable. It swaps all receive and transmit lanes; e.g., HS1TX(P) of the source is connected to HS1RX(P) of the sink.

Thunderbolt is the brand name of a hardware interface for the connection of external peripherals to a computer. It was developed by Intel in collaboration with Apple. It was initially marketed under the name Light Peak and first sold as part of an end-user product on February 24, 2011.

Thunderbolt combines PCI Express (PCIe) and DisplayPort (DP) into two serial signals and provides DC power via a single cable. Up to six peripherals may be supported by a single connector through various topologies. Thunderbolt 1 and 2 use the same connector as Mini DisplayPort (MDP), whereas Thunderbolt 3, 4, and 5 use the USB-C connector and support USB devices.

== Description ==
Symbol used on Thunderbolt ports

Former Thunderbolt logo, used until September 2023

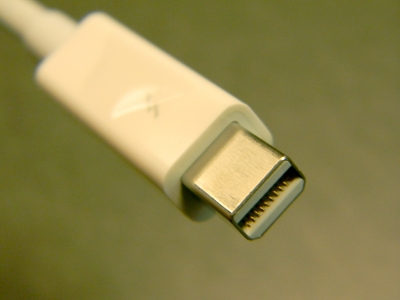
Thunderbolt 1 or 2 connector

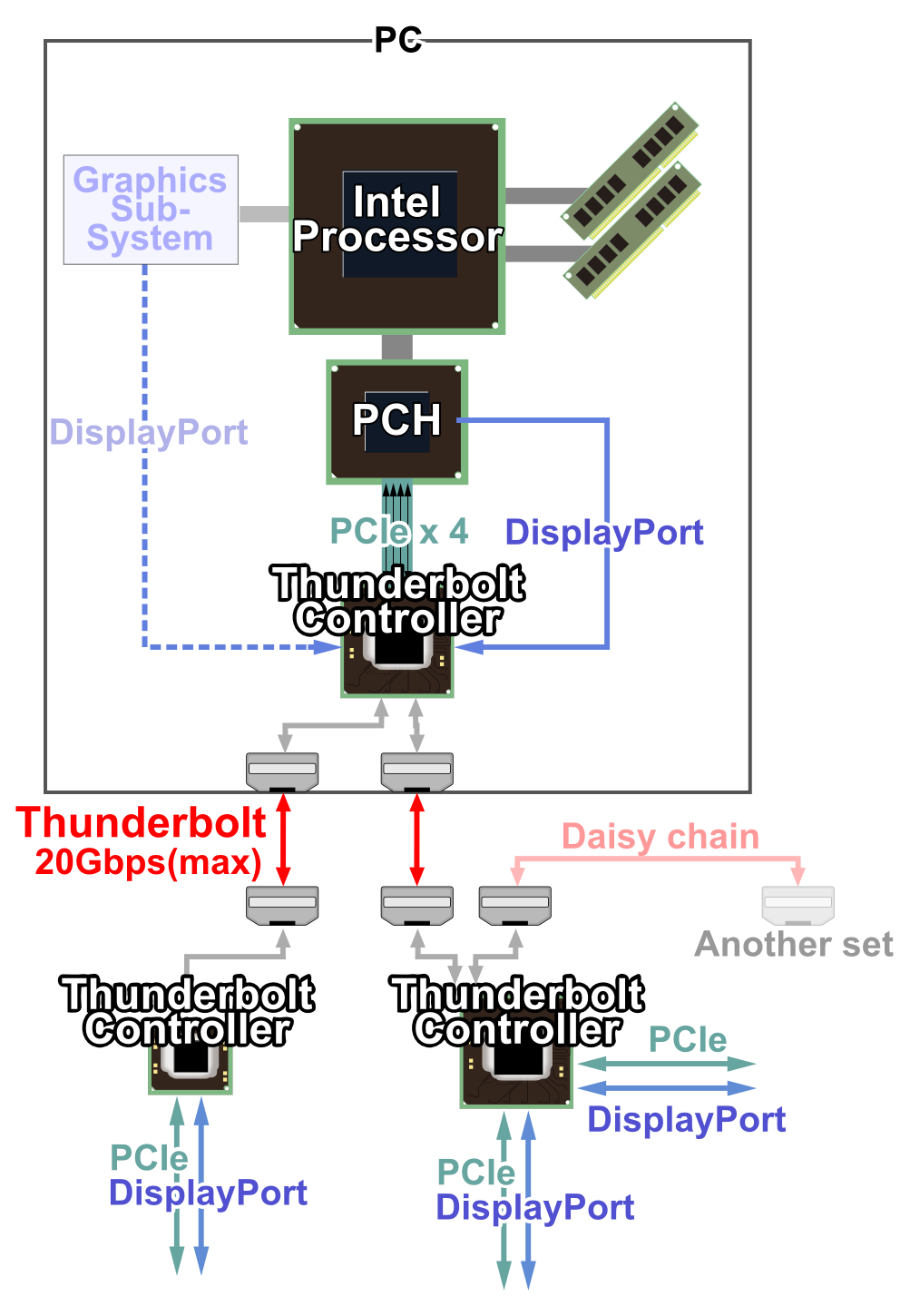
Thunderbolt link connections Intel provides two types of Thunderbolt controllers: a two-port and a one-port type. Both peripherals and computers require controllers.

Block diagram of a typical Thunderbolt 3 dock

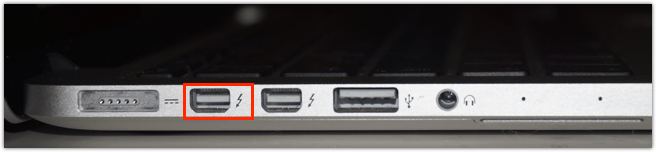
Thunderbolt 2 port on a MacBook Pro

Thunderbolt controllers multiplex one or more individual data lanes from connected PCIe and DisplayPort devices for transmission via two duplex Thunderbolt lanes, then de-multiplex them for use by PCIe and DisplayPort devices on the other end. A single Thunderbolt port supports up to six Thunderbolt devices via hubs or daisy chains; as many of these as the host has DP sources may be Thunderbolt monitors. A device with fewer than four PCIe lanes still qualifies as a Thunderbolt device but will not support the full capabilities and speeds of Thunderbolt.

A single Mini DisplayPort monitor or other device of any kind may be connected directly or at the very end of the chain. Thunderbolt is interoperable with DP-1.1a compatible devices. When connected to a DP-compatible device, the Thunderbolt port can provide a native DisplayPort signal with four lanes of output data at no more than 5.4 Gbit/s per Thunderbolt lane. When connected to a Thunderbolt device, the per-lane data rate achieves 10 Gbit/s and the four Thunderbolt lanes are configured as two duplex lanes, each 10 Gbit/s, comprising one lane of input and one lane of output.

Thunderbolt can be implemented on PCIe graphics cards, which have access to DisplayPort data and PCIe connectivity, or on the motherboard of computers with onboard video, such as the MacBook Air.

The interface was originally intended to run exclusively on an optical physical layer using components and flexible optical fiber cabling developed by Intel partners and at Intel's Silicon Photonics lab. It was initially marketed under the name Light Peak and, after 2011, as Silicon Photonics Link. However, it was eventually discovered that conventional copper wiring could furnish the desired 10 Gbit/s per channel at lower cost.

This copper-based version of the Light Peak concept was co-developed by Apple and Intel. Apple registered Thunderbolt as a trademark but later transferred the mark to Intel, which held overriding intellectual property rights. Thunderbolt was commercially introduced on Apple's 2011 MacBook Pro, using the same Apple-developed connector as Mini DisplayPort.

In January 2013, Sumitomo Electric Industries began selling optical Thunderbolt cables of up to 30 m (100 ft) in length in Japan, while in late September 2013, Corning Inc. started selling fiber-optic cables of up to 60 m (200 ft) in length in the United States.

== History ==
=== Introduction (2009) ===
Intel introduced Light Peak at the 2009 Intel Developer Forum (IDF), using a prototype Mac Pro logic board to run two 1080p video streams plus LAN and storage devices over a single 30-meter optical cable with modified USB ends. The system was driven by a prototype PCI Express card, with two optical buses powering four ports. Jason Ziller, head of Intel's Optical I/O Program Office, presented the internal components of the technology under a microscope and the delivery of data through an oscilloscope. The technology was described as having an initial speed of 10 Gbit/s over plastic optical cables, alongside promising a final speed of 100 Gbit/s. At the show, Intel announced Light Peak-equipped systems would begin to appear in 2010, and posted a YouTube video showing Light Peak-connected HD cameras, laptops, docking stations, and HD monitors.

On May 4, 2010, in Brussels, Intel demonstrated a laptop with a Light Peak connector, indicating that the technology had shrunk enough to fit inside such a device, and had the laptop send two simultaneous HD video streams down the connection, indicating that at least some fraction of the software/firmware stacks and protocols were functional. At the same demonstration, Intel officials stated they expected hardware manufacturing to begin around the end of 2010.

In September 2010, some early commercial prototypes from manufacturers were demonstrated at the Intel Developer Forum 2010.

=== Thunderbolt 1 (2011) ===
CNET's Brooke Crothers said it was rumored that the early-2011 MacBook Pro update would include some sort of new data port, and he speculated it would be Light Peak (Thunderbolt). At the time, there were no details on the physical implementation, and mock-ups appeared showing a system similar to the earlier Intel demos that utilizes a combined USB/Light Peak port. Shortly before the release of the new machines, the USB Implementers Forum (USB-IF) announced it would not allow such a combination port, and that USB was not open to modification in that way.

Other implementations of the technology began in 2012, with desktop boards offering the interconnection now available.

Apple stated in February 2011 that the port was based on Mini DisplayPort, not USB. As the system was described, Intel's solution to the display connection problem became clear: Thunderbolt controllers multiplex data from existing DP systems with data from the PCIe port into a single cable. Older displays using DP 1.1a or earlier must be located at the end of a Thunderbolt device chain, but native displays can be anywhere along the line. Thunderbolt devices can go anywhere on the chain. In that respect, Thunderbolt shares a relationship with the older ACCESS.bus system, which used the display connector to support a low-speed bus.

Apple states that up to six daisy-chained peripherals are supported per Thunderbolt port and that the display should be attached at the end of the chain if it does not support daisy-chaining.

In February 2011, Apple introduced MacBook Pro (13-inch, Early 2011), MacBook Pro (15-inch, Early 2011), and MacBook Pro (17-inch, Early 2011) featuring one Thunderbolt port. In May 2011, Apple introduced the iMac (21.5-inch, Mid 2011), featuring one Thunderbolt port, and the iMac (27-inch, Mid 2011), featuring two Thunderbolt ports. In July 2011, Apple introduced Mac Mini (Mid 2011), MacBook Air (11-inch, Mid 2011), MacBook Air (13-inch, Mid 2011), and Apple Thunderbolt Display, featuring one Thunderbolt port for daisy-chaining or other devices.

In May 2011, Apple announced a new line of iMacs that includes the Thunderbolt interface.

The Thunderbolt port on the new Macs is in the same location relative to other ports and maintains the same physical dimensions and pinout as the prior Mini DisplayPort connector. The main visible difference on Thunderbolt-equipped Macs is a Thunderbolt symbol next to the port.

The DisplayPort standard is partially compatible with Thunderbolt, as the two share Apple's physically compatible Mini DisplayPort connector. The target display mode of iMacs requires a Thunderbolt cable to accept a video-in signal from another Thunderbolt-capable computer. A DP monitor must be the last (or only) device in a chain of Thunderbolt devices.

Intel announced it would release a developer kit in the second quarter of 2011, while manufacturers of hardware development equipment have indicated they will add support for testing and development of Thunderbolt devices. The developer kit is being provided only on request.

In July 2011, Sony released its Vaio Z21 line of notebook computers that had a "Power Media Dock" that uses optical Thunderbolt (Light Peak) to connect to an external graphics card using a combination port that behaves like USB electrically, but that also includes the optical interconnect required for Thunderbolt.

Thunderbolt 1 ran at 10 Gbit/s, making it faster than USB at the time.

=== Thunderbolt 2 (2013) ===
In June 2013, Intel announced that the next version of Thunderbolt, based on the controller code-named "Falcon Ridge" (running at 20 Gbit/s), is officially named "Thunderbolt 2" and entered production in 2013. The data rate of 20 Gbit/s is made possible by joining the two existing 10 Gbit/s-channels, which does not change the maximum bandwidth, but makes its usage more flexible.

In June 2013, Apple announced the Mac Pro (Late 2013) featuring six Thunderbolt 2 ports. In October 2013, Apple announced MacBook Pro (Retina, 13-inch, Late 2013), and MacBook Pro (Retina, 15-inch, Late 2013) featuring two Thunderbolt 2 ports. In October 2014, Apple announced Mac Mini (Late 2014), and iMac (Retina 5K, 27-inch, Late 2014) featuring two Thunderbolt 2 ports. In March 2015, Apple announced MacBook Air (11-inch, Early 2015), and MacBook Air (13-inch, Early 2015) featuring one Thunderbolt 2 port.

At the physical level, the bandwidth of Thunderbolt 1 is identical to that of Thunderbolt 2, which means Thunderbolt 1 cabling is compatible with Thunderbolt 2 interfaces. At the logical level, Thunderbolt 2 enables channel aggregation, whereby the two previously separate 10 Gbit/s channels can be combined into a single logical 20 Gbit/s channel.

Intel says Thunderbolt 2 will be able to transfer a 4K video while simultaneously displaying it on a discrete monitor.

Thunderbolt 2 incorporates DisplayPort 1.2 support, which allows for video streaming to a single 4K video monitor or dual QHD monitors. Thunderbolt 2 is backward compatible, which means that all Thunderbolt cables and connectors are compatible with Thunderbolt 1.

The first Thunderbolt 2 product for the consumer market was Asus's Z87-Deluxe/Quad motherboard, announced on August 19, 2013, and the first system released with Thunderbolt 2 was Apple's late 2013 Retina MacBook Pro, on October 22, 2013.

=== Thunderbolt 3 (2015) ===
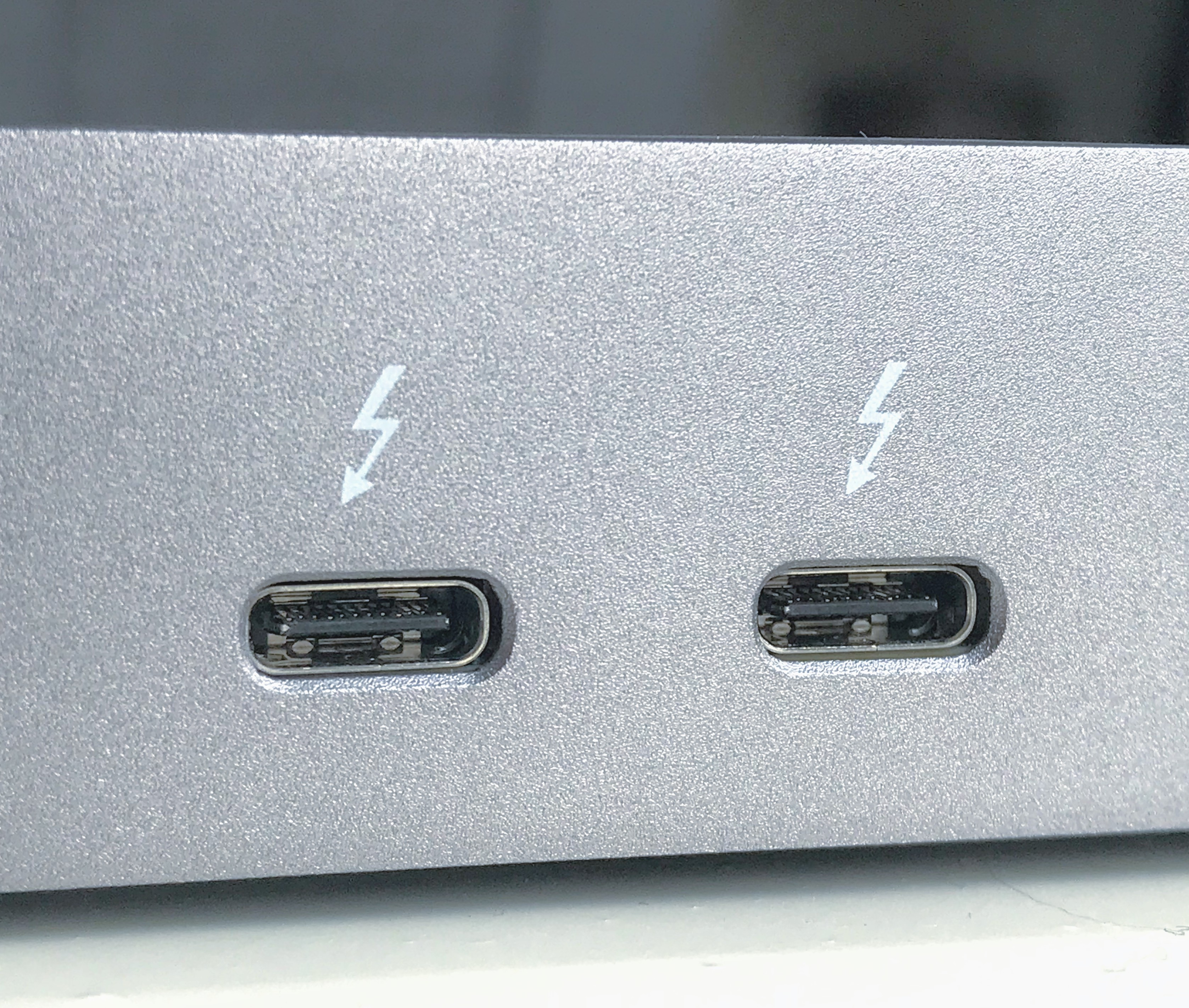
Thunderbolt 3, 4, or 5 ports

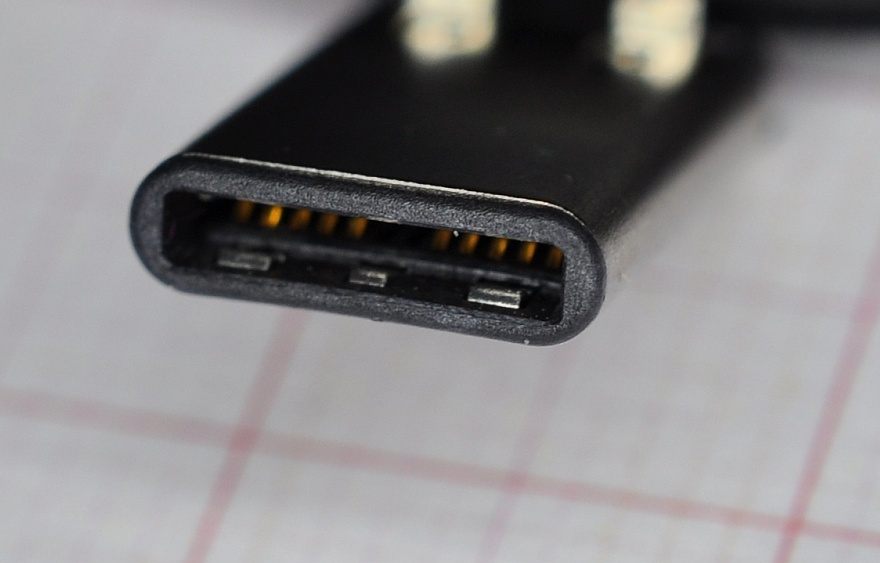
The USB Full-Featured Type‑C (USB‑C) plug, the plug for Thunderbolt 3, 4, and 5

Thunderbolt 3 is a hardware interface developed by Intel. It shares USB-C connectors with USB, supports USB 3.1 Gen 2, and can require special active cables for maximum performance for cable lengths over 0.5 meters (1.5 feet). Compared to Thunderbolt 2, it doubles the bandwidth to 40 Gbit/s (5 GB/s). It allows up to four lanes of PCI Express 3.0 (32.4 Gbit/s) for general-purpose data transfer, and four lanes of DisplayPort 1.4 HBR3 (32.40 Gbit/s before 8/10 encoding removal, and 25.92 Gbit/s after) for video, but the maximum combined data rate cannot exceed 40 Gbit/s; video data is prioritized and so uses all needed bandwidth, the remainder being available to PCIe. DP 1.2 support is mandatory, while DP 1.4 is optional. Other overheads are possible on PCIe data (1.5% of 128b/130b is also removed) and Thunderbolt 3 protocol (either optimise for speed or for latency), the last one gives only 21.6 Gbit/s to 25 Gbit/s. Thunderbolt 3 uses 64b/66b encoding after that, which means the real rate is bigger than 40 Gbit/s, 2 times 20.625 Gbit/s.

Intel's Thunderbolt 3 controller (codenamed Alpine Ridge, or the new Titan Ridge) halves power consumption, and simultaneously drives two external 4K displays at 60 Hz (or a single external 4K display at 120 Hz, or a 5K display at 60 Hz when using Apple's implementation for the late-2016 MacBook Pros) instead of just the single display previous controllers can drive. The new controller supports PCIe 3.0 and other protocols, including DisplayPort 1.2 (allowing for 4K resolutions at 60 Hz). Thunderbolt 3 has up to 15 watts of power delivery on copper cables and no power delivery capability on optical cables. Using USB-C on copper cables, it can incorporate USB power delivery, allowing the ports to source or sink up to 100 watts of power. This eliminates the need for a separate power supply from some devices. Thunderbolt 3 allows backwards compatibility with the first two versions by the use of adapters or transitional cables.

Intel offers three varieties for each of the controllers:

- Double Port (DP) uses a PCIe 3.0 ×4 link to provide two Thunderbolt 3 ports (DSL6540, JHL6540, JHL7540)
- Single Port (SP) uses a PCIe 3.0 ×4 link to provide one Thunderbolt 3 port (DSL6340, JHL6340, JHL7340)
- Low Power (LP) uses a PCIe 3.0 ×2 link to provide one Thunderbolt 3 port (JHL6240).

This follows previous practice, where higher-end devices such as the second-generation Mac Pro, iMac, Retina MacBook Pro, and Mac Mini use two-port controllers; while lower-end, lower-power devices, like the MacBook Air, use the one-port version.

Support was added to Intel's Skylake architecture chipsets, shipping during late 2015 into early 2016.

Devices with Thunderbolt 3 ports began shipping at the beginning of December 2015, including notebooks running Microsoft Windows (from Acer, Asus, Clevo, HP, Dell, Dell Alienware, Lenovo, MSI, Razer, and Sony), as well as motherboards (from Gigabyte Technology), and a 0.5 m Thunderbolt 3 passive USB-C cable (from Lintes Technology).

In October 2016, Apple announced MacBook Pro (13-inch, 2016, 2 Thunderbolt 3 Ports), which, as the name indicates, features two Thunderbolt 3 ports, MacBook Pro (13-inch, 2016, 4 Thunderbolt 3 Ports), and MacBook Pro (15-inch, 2016), which features four Thunderbolt 3 ports. In June 2017, Apple announced iMac (21.5-inch, 2017), iMac (Retina 4K, 21.5-inch, 2017), iMac (Retina 5K, 27-inch, 2017) which feature two Thunderbolt 3 ports, as well as the iMac Pro, which featured four Thunderbolt 3 ports and was released in December 2017. In October 2018, Apple announced MacBook Air (Retina, 13-inch, 2018), featuring 2 Thunderbolt 3 ports and Mac mini (2018) featuring four Thunderbolt 3 ports. In June 2019, Apple unveiled Mac Pro (2019) and Mac Pro (Rack, 2019) featuring up to twelve Thunderbolt 3 ports, and Pro Display XDR, which features one Thunderbolt 3 port, both released in December 2019. In March 2022, Apple released Studio Display featuring one Thunderbolt 3 port.

On January 8, 2018, Intel announced a product refresh (codenamed Titan Ridge) with "enhanced robustness" and support for DisplayPort 1.4. Intel offers a single-port (JHL7340) and double-port (JHL7540) version of this host controller and a peripheral controller supporting two Thunderbolt 3 ports (JHL7440). The new peripheral controller can now act as a USB sink (compatible with regular USB-C ports).

The Apple Pro Display XDR, which macOS allows to connect using two HBR3 connections to a Mac, doesn't support Display Stream Compression (DSC). That would be 51.84 Gbit/s, impossible for Thunderbolt 3, but it works because the two 3008×3384 10bpc 60 Hz 648.91 MHz signals of the XDR display only require 38.9 Gbit/s total, and Thunderbolt does not transmit the DisplayPort stuffing symbols used to fill the HBR3 bandwidth.

==== USB4 (2019) ====
The USB4 specification was released on August 29, 2019, by the USB Implementers Forum, based on the Thunderbolt 3 protocol specification.

It supports 40 Gbit/s (5 GB/s) throughput, is optionally compatible with Thunderbolt 3, and is backward compatible with USB 3.2 and USB 2.0. The architecture defines a method to share a single high-speed link with multiple end device types dynamically that best serves the transfer of data by type and application.

USB4 supports DisplayPort 2.0 over its alternative mode.

DisplayPort 2.0 can support higher than 8K resolution at 60 Hz losslessly due to new UHBR 10, 13.5, and 20 signaling standards (DSC 1.2 used in DisplayPort 1.4 for that resolution is not lossless) in 8 bit and 8K 60 Hz with 10 bit color and use up to 80 Gbit/s (effective bandwidth 77.37 Gbit/s), which is double the amount available to USB data, because (just as previously in DisplayPort 1.4) it sends almost all the data in one direction (to the monitor) and can thus use all four data lanes at once. Resolutions up to 16K (15360×8640) 60 Hz display with 10-bit Y'CbCr 4:4:4 or RGB are possible.

In November 2020, Apple announced MacBook Air (M1, 2020), MacBook Pro (13-inch, M1, 2020), and Mac mini (M1, 2020) featuring USB4 ports.

===== USB4 PCIe Mode =====
USB4 makes the PCIe aspects of Thunderbolt "open source" – PCIe USB devices can be released without Thunderbolt certification. But notably, those devices will not be allowed to use Thunderbolt branding. However, Thunderbolt 4 devices use PCIe Mode with added certification labeling, and promoting backwards compatibility. This means multiple rival devices may use different brandings to accomplish the same task. USB4 PCIe devices can be backwards compatible with Thunderbolt 1–3, but this is not required. USB4 PCIe Mode is not an Alternate Mode, like DisplayPort Alternate Mode, and Microsoft requires devices with USB4 to include PCIe support in order to be WHQL/Windows certified PCs.

=== Thunderbolt 4 (2020) ===
Thunderbolt 4 was announced at CES 2020 and the final specification was released in July 2020. The key differences between Thunderbolt 4 and Thunderbolt 3 are a minimum bandwidth requirement of 32 Gbit/s for PCIe link, support for dual 4K displays (DisplayPort 1.4), and Intel VT-d-based direct memory access protection to prevent physical DMA attacks.

Another major improvement is that Thunderbolt 4 supports Thunderbolt Alternate Mode USB hubs ("Multi-port Accessory Architecture"), and not just daisy chaining. Those hubs are backward compatible with Thunderbolt 3 devices and can be backward compatible with Thunderbolt 3 hosts (Titan Ridge only; with Alpine Ridge, the additional downstream ports get downgraded to USB 3).

The maximum bandwidth remains at 40 Gbit/s, the same as Thunderbolt 3 and four times as fast as USB 3.2 Gen 2×1. Supporting products began arriving in late 2020 and included Tiger Lake mobile processors for Intel Evo notebooks and 8000-series standalone Thunderbolt controllers (codenamed Goshen Ridge for devices and Maple Ridge for hosts). On desktop native Thunderbolt 4 was added in Intel Arrow Lake PCIe 4 lanes directly on the CPU, and by doing so removed data limitation of 25 Gbit/s, now all 40 Gbit/s could be used for data.

=== Thunderbolt 5 (2023) ===
On September 12, 2023, Intel previewed Thunderbolt 5 (codenamed Barlow Ridge), aligned to the USB Implementers Forum's (USB-IF) USB4 2.0 specification. It provides symmetric bandwidth of 80 Gbit/s, e.g., for mass-storage devices, double that of Thunderbolt 4, and unidirectional bandwidth of 120 Gbit/s for displays (three times that of Thunderbolt 3 and 4), supporting dual 8K displays at 60 Hz. The minimum required bandwidth remains unchanged from Thunderbolt 4: 32 Gbit/s for the PCIe link.

The full specifications cover:

- Supporting the latest version of USB4 2.0 80 Gbit/s specification
- Doubling the total bandwidth of Thunderbolt 4 to 80 Gbit/s symmetric, or 120 Gbit/s in either direction and 40 the other, generally for video-intensive uses
- Support for DisplayPort 2.1
- Two times (64 Gbit/s) the PCI Express data-throughput using PCI Express Gen. 4 × 4, for faster storage and external graphics
- Up to 240 W of charging power downstream
- Works with existing passive cables up to 1 m (3.3 ft) via PAM-3
- Compatible with previous versions of Thunderbolt, USB, and DisplayPort
- Supported by Intel's enabling and certification programs

Intel announced that computers and accessories compatible with Thunderbolt 5 will come out starting in 2024.

In October 2024, Apple announced the Mac Mini (M4 Pro, 2024) and the 14-inch and 16-inch MacBook Pro (M4 Pro/Max, 2024) with three Thunderbolt 5 ports. In March 2025, Apple announced the release of the Mac Studio (M4 Max/M3 Ultra, 2025), with the Max model having four Thunderbolt 5/USB4 USB-C ports and the Ultra having six Thunderbolt 5/USB4 USB-C ports. All these devices operate at up to 120Gbit/s in both Thunderbolt 5 or USB4 mode.

=== Royalty situation (2019–) ===
On May 24, 2017, Intel announced that Thunderbolt 3 would become a royalty-free standard to OEMs and chip manufacturers in 2018, as part of an effort to boost the adoption of the protocol. The Thunderbolt 3 specification was later released to the USB-IF on March 4, 2019, making it royalty-free, to be used to form USB4. Intel says it will retain control over the certification of all Thunderbolt 3 devices. Intel also states it employs "mandatory certification for all Thunderbolt products".

Before March 2019, there were no AMD chipsets or computers with Thunderbolt support released or announced due to the certification requirements (Intel did not certify non-Intel platforms). However, the YouTuber Wendell Wilson from Level1Techs was able to get Thunderbolt 3 support on an AMD computer with a Threadripper CPU and Titan Ridge add-in card working by modifying the firmware, indicating that the lack of Thunderbolt support on non-Intel systems is not due to any hardware limitations. As of May 2019, it is possible to have Thunderbolt 3 support on AMD using add-in cards without any problems, and motherboards like ASRock X570 Creator already have Thunderbolt 3 ports.

In January 2020, Intel certified ASRock X570 Phantom Gaming ITX/TB3, and now vendors are freely allowed to produce Thunderbolt controller silicon (even though those ASRock motherboards used Intel Titan Ridge).

Asus currently supports Thunderbolt 3 on AMD with the add-in card Thunderboltex 3-TR, being compatible with AMD motherboards and Ryzen 3, 5 (56xx): ROG Strix B550-E Gaming, ROG Strix B550-F Gaming, Prime B550-PLUS, TUF Gaming B550-Plus. The ASUS ProArt B550-Creator has 2 Thunderbolt 4 ports.

GIGABYTE also has a pair of certified motherboards, B550 VISION D-P and B550 VISION D, with an Intel Thunderbolt 3 controller.

== Copper vs. optical ==
Though Thunderbolt was originally conceived as an optical technology, Intel switched to copper-based electrical connections to reduce costs and to supply up to 10 watts of power to connected devices.

In 2009, Intel officials said the company was "working on bundling the optical fiber with copper wire so Light Peak can be used to power devices plugged into the PC." In 2010, Intel said the original intent was "to have one single connector technology" that would let "electrical USB 3.0 ... and piggyback on USB 3.0 or 4.0 DC power." Light Peak aimed to make great strides in consumer-ready optical technology, by then having achieved "[connectors rated] for 7,000 insertions, which matches or exceeds other PC connections ... cables [that were tied] in multiple knots to make sure it didn't break and the loss is acceptable," and, "You can almost get two people pulling on it at once and it won't break the fibre." They predicted that "Light Peak" cables will be no more expensive than HDMI."

In January 2011, Intel's David Perlmutter told Computerworld that initial Thunderbolt implementations would be based on copper wires. "The copper came out very good, surprisingly better than what we thought," he said. A major advantage of copper is its ability to carry power. The final Thunderbolt standard specifies 10 W DC on every port. See comparison section below.

Intel and industry partners are still developing optical Thunderbolt hardware and cables. The optical fiber cables would run "tens of meters" but would not supply power, at least not initially. The version from Corning contains four 80/125 μm VSDN (Very Short Distance Network) fibers to transport an infrared signal up to 190 m (600 ft). The conversion of an electrical signal to optical is embedded into the cable itself, so the current MDP connector is forward-compatible. Eventually, Intel hopes for a purely optical transceiver assembly embedded in the PC.

The first such optical Thunderbolt cable was introduced by Sumitomo Electric Industries in January 2013. It is available in lengths of 10 m (30 ft), 20 m (70 ft), and 30 m (100 ft). However, those cables are retailed almost exclusively in Japan, and the price is 20 to 30 times that of copper Thunderbolt cables.

German company DeLock also released optical Thunderbolt cables in lengths of 10 m (30 ft), 20 m (70 ft), and 30 m (100 ft) in 2013, priced similarly to the Sumitomo ones, and retailed only in Germany.

In September 2013, glass company Corning Inc. released the first range of optical Thunderbolt cables available in the Western marketplace, along with optical USB 3.0 cables, both under the brand name "Optical Cables". Half the diameter and a fifth the mass of comparable copper Thunderbolt cables, they work with the 10 Gbit/s Thunderbolt protocol and the 20 Gbit/s Thunderbolt 2 protocol, and thus are able to work with all self-powered Thunderbolt devices (unlike copper cables, optical cables cannot provide power). The cables extend the current 30 m (100 ft) maximum length offered by copper to a maximum of 60 m (200 ft).

Before 2020, there were no optical Thunderbolt 3 cables on the market. However, optical Thunderbolt 1 and 2 cables could be used at the time with Apple's Thunderbolt 3 (USB-C) to Thunderbolt 2 adapters on each end of the cable. This achieves connections up to the 60 m (200 ft) maximum offered by previous versions of the standard.

In April 2019, Corning showed an optical Thunderbolt 3 cable at the 2019 NAB Show in Las Vegas. Just over a year later, in September 2020, Corning released their optical Thunderbolt 3 cables in lengths of 5 m (20 ft), 10 m (30 ft), 15 m (50 ft), 25 m (80 ft), and 50 m (160 ft). In the meantime, Taiwanese company Areca released optical Thunderbolt 3 cables in April 2020 in lengths of 10 m (30 ft), 20 m (70 ft), and 30 m (100 ft).

Copper versions of Thunderbolt 4 cables offer full 40 Gbit/s speed and support backward compatibility with all versions of USB (up to USB4), DisplayPort Alternate Mode (DP 1.4 HBR3), and Thunderbolt 3. Released in early 2021, they were also to be available in three specified lengths: 0.2 m (0.66 ft), 0.8 m (2.6 ft), and 2 m (6.6 ft) – with many companies initially offering 0.8 m (2.6 ft) ones.

Copper Thunderbolt 4 cables up to 1.0 m (3.3 ft) are passive cables, while longer cables must integrate active signal conditioning circuitry. 2 m (6.6 ft) maximum is the length of active cables available from most brands, including CalDigit, Cable Matters, et al., while Apple are currently the only company that offers a 3 m (9.8 ft) active copper cable.

Optical Thunderbolt 4 cables were targeting lengths from ≈5 m (16 ft) to 50 m (160 ft), although this may not happen, instead jumping to Thunderbolt 5 optical cables, sometime after the arrival of that standard in late 2024.

The 80 Gbit/s mode of USB4, used in Thunderbolt 5, uses three-level PAM3 instead of two-level NRZ encoding used by all older versions of Thunderbolt and USB. As a result, active (including optical) cables that have worked for previous generations will not allow this new speed to be achieved. Due to how the link is negotiated, Thunderbolt 3 cables will not work at all while Thunderbolt 4 cables will work at 40 Gbit/s speed.

== Compatibility ==
=== Before Thunderbolt 3 ===
==== Peripheral devices ====
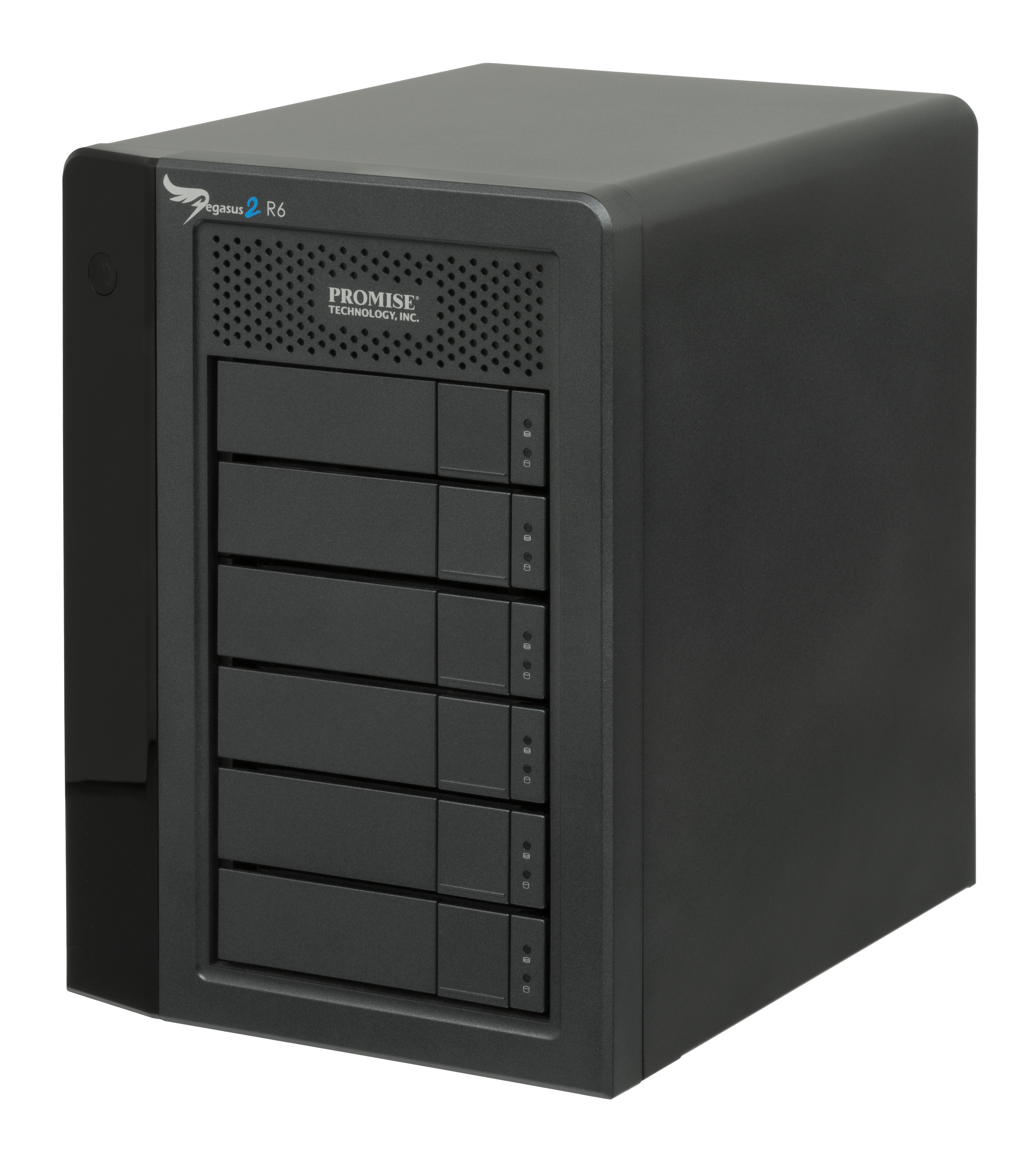
A multiple hard disk storage device that attaches to a computer through a Thunderbolt connection

The first Thunderbolt peripheral devices appeared in retail stores only in late 2011, following Apple's release of its first Thunderbolt-equipped computer in early 2011 with MacBook Pro, with the Pegasus R4 (4-drive) and Pegasus R6 (6-drive) RAID enclosures by Promise Technology aimed at the prosumer and professional market, initially offering up to 12 TB of storage, later increased to 32 TB in the Pegasus R8 (8-drive). Sales of these units were hurt by the 2011 floods in Thailand (who manufacture much of the world's supply of hard-drives) resulting in a cut to worldwide hard-drive production and a subsequent driving-up of storage costs, hence the retail price of these Promise units increased in response, contributing to a slower take-up of the devices.

It also took some time for other storage manufacturers to release products: most were smaller devices aimed at the professional market, and focused on speed rather than high capacity. Many storage devices were under a terabyte in size, with some featuring SSDs for faster external-data access rather than standard hard-drives.

Other companies have offered interface products that can route multiple older, usually slower, connections through a single Thunderbolt port. In July 2011, Apple released its Apple Thunderbolt Display, whose Gigabit Ethernet and other older connector types made it the first hub of its type. Later, companies such as Belkin, CalDigit, Other World Computing, Matrox, StarTech, and Elgato have all released Thunderbolt docks.

As of late 2012, few other storage devices with capacities of ten terabytes or more had appeared. Exceptions included Sonnet Technologies' highly priced professional units, and Drobo's four- and five-drive enclosures, the latter featuring their own BeyondRAID proprietary data-handling system.

Backwards compatibility with non-Thunderbolt-equipped computers was a problem, as most storage devices featured only two Thunderbolt ports, for daisy-chaining up to six devices from each one. In mid-2012, LaCie, Drobo, and other device makers started to swap out one of the two Thunderbolt ports for a USB 3.0 connection on some of their low-to-mid end products. Later models had the USB 3.0 added in addition to the two Thunderbolt ports, including those from LaCie on their 2big range.

==== Apple devices before Thunderbolt 3 ====
Apple released its first Thunderbolt-equipped computer in early 2011 with MacBook Pro, and have continued to immediately update their devices with newer generations of Thunderbolt as soon as available.

List of Apple devices featuring Thunderbolt ports:

- MacBook Pro (Retina, 13-inch, Late 2012 to Early 2013)
- MacBook Pro (Retina, 15-inch, Mid 2012 to Early 2013)
- MacBook Pro (17-inch, Early 2011 to Late 2011)
- MacBook Pro (15-inch, Early 2011 to Mid 2012)
- MacBook Pro (13-inch, Early 2011 to Mid 2012)
- MacBook Air (13-inch, Mid 2011 to Early 2014)
- MacBook Air (11-inch, Mid 2011 to Early 2014)
- Mac Mini (Mid 2011 to Late 2012)
- iMac (27-inch, Mid 2011 to Late 2013)
- iMac (21.5-inch, Mid 2011 to Mid 2014)

The late 2013 Retina MacBook Pro was the first product to have Thunderbolt 2 ports, following which manufacturers started to update their model offerings to those featuring the newer, faster, 20 Gbit/s connection throughout 2014. Again, among the first was Promise Technology, who released updated Pegasus 2 versions of their R4 and R6 models along with an even larger R8 (8-drive) RAID unit, offering up to 32 TBs of storage. Later, other brands similarly introduced high capacity models with the newer connection type, including SanDisk Professional (with their G-RAID Studio models offering up to 24 TB) and LaCie (with their 5big, and rack mounted 8big models, offering up to 48 TB). LaCie also offering updated designed versions of their 2big mainstream consumer models, up to 12 TB, using new 6 TB hard-drives.

List of Apple devices featuring Thunderbolt 2 ports:

- MacBook Pro (Retina, 15-inch, Late 2013 to Mid 2015)
- MacBook Pro (Retina, 13-inch, Late 2013 to Early 2015)
- MacBook Air (13-inch, Early 2015 to 2017)
- MacBook Air (11-inch, Early 2015)
- Mac Mini (Late 2014)
- iMac (Retina 4K, 21.5-inch, Late 2015)
- iMac (21.5-inch, Late 2015)
- iMac (Retina 5K, 27-inch, Late 2014 to Late 2015)
- Mac Pro (Late 2013)

=== After Thunderbolt 3 ===
Although Thunderbolt initially had poor hardware support outside of Apple devices, and had been relegated to a niche gadget port, adoption of Thunderbolt 3, which uses the USB-C connector standard, meant wider market acceptance, especially as it later became part of the USB4 standard.

Thunderbolt 3 was introduced in late 2015, with several motherboard manufacturers and OEM laptop manufacturers including Thunderbolt 3 with their products. Gigabyte and MSI, large computer component manufacturers, entered the market for the first time with Thunderbolt 3 compatible components.

Dell was the first to include Thunderbolt 3 ports in laptops with their XPS Series and their Dell Alienware range.

Details on compatibility are available from the Thunderbolt Technology Community Web site.

A single Thunderbolt 3 or later port provides data transfer, support for two 4K 60 Hz displays, and quick notebook charging up to 100W with a single cable. Any Thunderbolt or USB dock can connect to a Thunderbolt 3 computer. USB devices can be connected to a Thunderbolt 3 or later port. DisplayPort and Mini DisplayPort devices are supported.

Some limited functionality may be available if a Thunderbolt device is connected to an ordinary USB-C port; this is implementation-dependent, and not guaranteed.

==== Peripherals since Thunderbolt 3 ====
Several vendors such as Dell, HP Inc, Lenovo have released docks for their devices offering power button capabilities so that laptops can be powered on even if lid is closed and device power button is not accessible.
Some docks are equipped with two distinct NICs, each supporting a different bus HP Thunderbolt G4 Dock specifications ThinkPad Universal Thunderbolt 4 Dock. One of the NICs uses a USB interface for compatibility while the other NIC uses a PCIe interface for higher performance. The USB NIC supports 1Gbit/s Ethernet while the PCIe NIC supports 2.5Gbit/s Ethernet. When the dock is connected to a Thunderbolt/USB4 port the PCIe NIC is activated. When the dock is connected to a non Thunderbolt USB port the USB NIC is activated. This does not apply to Lenovo ThinkPad Universal Thunderbolt 4 Dock (40B0) since the vendor will keep the PCIe NIC disabled if the PC is based on a non vPro Intel CPU or an AMD CPU. This is not mandated by some hardware limitation, it is purely a marketing decision. In contrast, the HP Thunderbolt G4 dock will activate the PCIe NIC on all Thunderbolt/USB4 capable PCs based on Intel or AMD CPUs.

==== Backwards compatibility ====
The signaling for thunderbolt 1 and 2 devices are electrically compatible with Thunderbolt 3/4/5 ports. As a result, TB1/2 devices only require a passive adapter to connect to a later-version port if the device does not use bus power. Thunderbolt 3 devices can also be used with Thunderbolt 1 or 2 hosts using an adapter. Apple makes an adapter that works "bidirectionally".

However, newer Intel firmware on Windows has disabled Thunderbolt 1 and 2 support due to security concerns; older firmware allowed their use. Apple provides backwards support for Thunderbolt 1 and 2 devices on their Thunderbolt 4-enabled systems.

Thunderbolt 4/5 ports supports Thunderbolt 3 devices. Thunderbolt 4/5 devices do not work with Thunderbolt 1/2 hosts even with an adapter. Thunderbolt 4/5 devices work with Thunderbolt 3 ports on Apple devices, but compatibility is not guaranteed on the Thunderbolt 3 ports on other devices due to a smaller subset of Thunderbolt 3 being implemented.

==== Apple devices (since TB3) ====
Apple first included Thunderbolt 3 on Mac in 2016.

List of Apple devices featuring Thunderbolt 3 ports:

- MacBook Pro (13-inch, Two Thunderbolt 3 ports, 2016 to 2020)
- MacBook Pro (13-inch, Four Thunderbolt 3 ports, 2016 to 2020)
- MacBook Pro (15-inch, 2016 to 2019)
- MacBook Pro (16-inch, 2019)
- MacBook Air (Retina, 13-inch, 2018 to 2020)
- iMac (Retina 5K, 27-inch, 2017 to 2020)
- iMac (Retina 4K, 21.5-inch, 2017 to 2019)
- iMac (21.5-inch, 2017)
- iMac Pro (2017)
- Mac Pro (2019 + Rack, 2019)
- Mac Mini (2018)
- Pro Display XDR (2019)
- Studio Display (2022)

List of Apple devices featuring Thunderbolt 3/USB4 ports include:

- MacBook Pro (13-inch, M1, 2020 to M2, 2022)
- MacBook Pro (14-inch, M3, 2023)
- MacBook Air (13-inch, M1, 2020 to M3, 2024)
- MacBook Air (15-inch, M2, 2023 to M3, 2024)
- Mac Mini (M1, 2020)
- iMac (24-inch, M1, 2021 to M3, 2023)
- iPad Pro 11-inch (3rd generation, 2021 to 4th generation, 2022)
- iPad Pro 12.9-inch (5th generation, 2021 to 6th generation, 2022)
- iPad Pro 11‑inch (M4, 2024)
- iPad Pro 13‑inch (M4, 2024)
- iPad Pro 11‑inch (M5, 2025)
- iPad Pro 13‑inch (M5, 2025)

Apple started to include Thunderbolt 4 on some of their devices, starting in 2021 with the MacBook Pro.

List of Apple devices featuring Thunderbolt 4 ports include:

- MacBook Pro (14-inch, M1 Pro/Max, 2021 to M3 Pro/Max, 2023)
- MacBook Pro (16-inch, M1 Pro/Max, 2021 to M3 Pro/Max, 2023)
- Mac Studio (2022 to 2023)
- Mac Mini (2023)
- Mac Pro (2023 + Rack, 2023)
- iMac (24-inch, M4, 2024)
- Mac Mini (M4, 2024)
- MacBook Pro (14-inch, M4, 2024)
- MacBook Air (13-inch, M4, 2025)
- MacBook Air (15-inch, M4, 2025)
- MacBook Pro (14-inch, M5, 2025)

Apple started to include Thunderbolt 5 on some of their devices, starting in 2024 with the Mac Mini (M4 Pro) and 14-inch/16-inch MacBook Pro (M4 Pro/Max).

List of Apple devices featuring Thunderbolt 5 ports include:

- Mac Mini (M4 Pro, 2024)
- MacBook Pro (14-inch, M4 Pro/Max, 2024)
- MacBook Pro (16-inch, M4 Pro/Max, 2024)
- Mac Studio (M3 Ultra/M4 Max, 2025)
- MacBook Pro (14-inch, M5 Pro/Max, 2026)
- MacBook Pro (16-inch, M5 Pro/Max, 2026)

== Security vulnerabilities ==
=== Vulnerability to DMA attacks ===
Thunderbolt 3 – like many high-speed expansion buses, including PCI Express, PC Card, ExpressCard, FireWire, PCI, and PCI-X – is potentially vulnerable to a direct memory access (DMA) attack. If users extend the PCI Express bus (the most common high-speed expansion bus in systems as of 2018) with Thunderbolt, it allows very low-level access to the computer. An attacker could physically attach a malicious device, which, through its direct and unimpeded access to system memory and other devices, would be able to bypass almost all security measures of the operating system, allowing the attacker to read and write system memory, potentially exposing encryption keys or installing malware. Such attacks have been demonstrated by modifying inexpensive commodity Thunderbolt hardware. The IOMMU virtualization, if present, and configured by the BIOS and the operating system, can close a computer's vulnerability to DMA attacks, but only if the IOMMU can block the DMA access of malicious device. As of 2019, the major OS vendors had not taken into account the variety of ways in which a malicious device could take advantage of complex interactions between multiple emulated peripherals, exposing subtle bugs and vulnerabilities. Some motherboard and UEFI implementations offer Kernel DMA Protection. Intel VT-d-based direct memory access (DMA) protection is a mandatory requirement for Thunderbolt 4 Host Certification.

This vulnerability is not present when Thunderbolt is used as a system interconnection (IPoTB supported on OS X Mavericks), because the IP implementation runs on the underlying Thunderbolt low-latency packet-switching fabric, and the PCI Express protocol is not present on the cable. That means that if IPoTB networking is used between a group of computers, there is no threat of such DMA attack between them.

=== Vulnerability to Option ROM attacks ===
When a system with Thunderbolt boots, it loads and executes Option ROMs from attached devices. A malicious Option ROM can allow malware to execute before an operating system is started. It can then invade the kernel, log keystrokes, or steal encryption keys. The ease of connecting Thunderbolt devices to portable computers makes them ideal for evil-maid attacks.

Some systems load Option ROMs during firmware updates, allowing the malware in a Thunderbolt device's Option ROM to potentially overwrite the SPI flash ROM containing the system's boot firmware. In February 2015, Apple issued a Security Update to Mac OS X to eliminate the vulnerability of loading Option ROMs during firmware updates, although the system is still vulnerable to Option ROM attacks during normal boots.

Firmware-enforced boot security measures, such as UEFI Secure Boot (which specifies the enforcement of signatures or hash allowlists of Option ROMs) are designed to mitigate this kind of attack.

=== Vulnerability to data exposure attacks (Thunderspy) ===
In May 2020, seven major security flaws were discovered in the Thunderbolt protocol, collectively named Thunderspy. They allow a malicious party to access all data stored in a computer, even if the device is locked, password-protected, and has an encrypted hard drive. These vulnerabilities affect all Thunderbolt 1, 2 and 3 ports. The attack requires the computer to be in sleep mode and have a Thunderbolt controller with a writable firmware chip. A well-trained attacker with physical access to the computer ("evil maid") can perform the required steps in 5 minutes. With a malicious firmware, the attacker can covertly disable Thunderbolt security, clone device identities, and proceed to use DMA to extract data. Thunderspy vulnerabilities can largely be mitigated using Kernel DMA Protection, along with traditional anti-intrusion hardware features.

== Cables ==
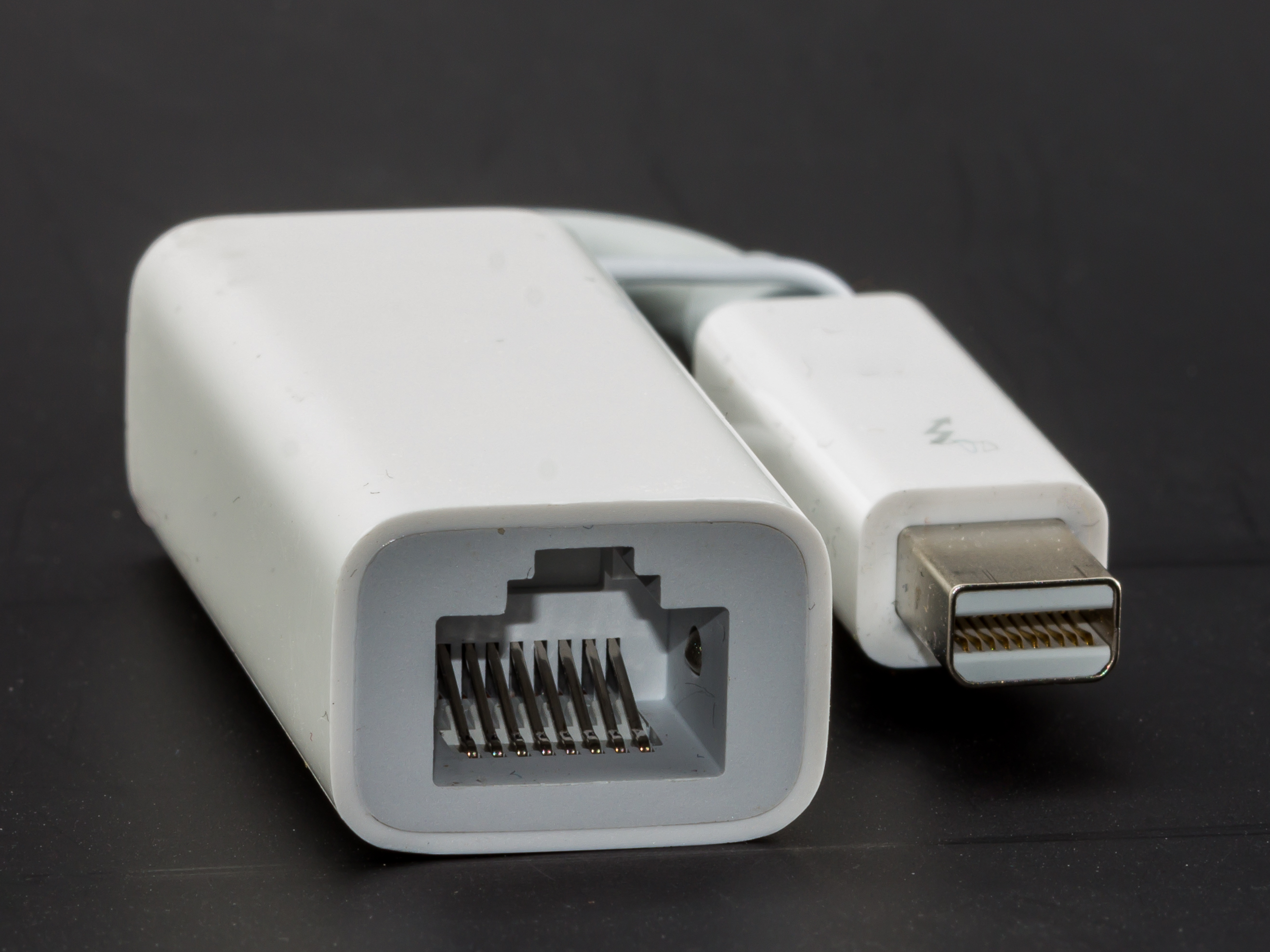
Thunderbolt Ethernet adapter

In June 2011, Apple introduced the first Thunderbolt cable, a 2 m (6.6 ft), 10 Gbit/s, full-duplex, active cable costing US$49.

In June 2012, Apple began selling a Thunderbolt-to-gigabit Ethernet adapter for US$29. In the third quarter of 2012, other manufacturers started shipping Thunderbolt cables, including cables reaching the 3-meter (9.8-foot) length limit, while some storage-enclosure builders began bundling Thunderbolt cables with their devices, rather than making customers buy them separately, as had been standard practice.

In January 2013, Apple reduced the price of their 2 m (6.6 ft) cable to US$39 and added a half-meter cable for US$29.

In Thunderbolt 3's introduction, Intel announced passive USB-C cables would connect Thunderbolt devices at speeds greater than USB 3.1 (though less than active Thunderbolt cables), thereby eliminating the adoption barrier of Thunderbolt active cable costs.

In mid-2016, copper Thunderbolt 3 cables became available at lengths up to 2 m (6.6 ft). However, 40 Gbit/s on copper required either active cables, or short (initially 0.5 m (1.6 ft), later 0.8 m (3 ft)) passive cables. Passive copper cables exceeding 0.8 m (3 ft) are limited to 20 Gbit/s. Despite that limit, passive cables provide USB 3 (20 Gbit/s) backward compatibility, while active cables support only USB 2.0 (480 Mbit/s). In April 2020, optical Thunderbolt 3 cables debuted (see Copper vs. optical).

Copper versions of Thunderbolt 4 cables offer full 40 Gbit/s speed and backward compatibility with all versions of USB (up to USB4), DisplayPort Alternate Mode (DP 1.4 HBR3), and Thunderbolt 3. Released in early 2021, they are also all to be available in three specified lengths: 0.2 m (0.66 ft), 0.8 m (2.6 ft), and 2 m (6.6 ft) – with many companies initially offering 0.8 m (2.6 ft) lengths. Copper Thunderbolt 4 cables up to 1 m (3.3 ft) are passive cables, while longer cables must integrate active signal conditioning circuitry. Apple are currently the only company that offers a 3 m (9.8 ft) copper cable, whilst other companies maximum length of copper cables are 2 m (6.6 ft). Optical Thunderbolt 4 cables were targeting lengths from ≈5 m (16 ft) to 50 m (160 ft), although this may not happen, instead jumping to Thunderbolt 5 optical cables, sometime after the arrival of that standard in late 2024.

== Intel controllers ==
Intel Thunderbolt controllers
Ver.	Model	Aimed	Ch.	Size (mm)	Power (W)	Family	Release date	Features
1	82523EF	?	4	15 × 15	3.8	Light Ridge	2010 Q4	
1	82523EFL	?	4	15 × 15	3.2	Light Ridge	2010 Q4	
1	DSL2510	?	2	15 × 15	?	Eagle Ridge	2011 Q1	
1	DSL2310	?	2	8 × 9	1.85	Eagle Ridge	2011 Q1	SFF
1	DSL2210	?	1	5 × 6	0.7	Port Ridge	2011 Q4	Device only
1	DSL3510H	?	4	12 × 12	3.4	Cactus Ridge	—N/a	Cancelled
1	DSL3510L	?	4	12 × 12	2.8	Cactus Ridge	2012 Q2	
1	DSL3310	?	2	12 × 12	2.1	Cactus Ridge	2012 Q2	Host only
1	DSL4510	?	4	12 × 12	?	Redwood Ridge	2013	
1	DSL4410	?	2	10 × 10	?	Redwood Ridge	2013	Host only
2	DSL5520	?	4	?	?	Falcon Ridge	2013 Q3	20 Gbit/s speed, DisplayPort 1.2
2	DSL5320	?	2	?	?	Falcon Ridge	2013 Q3	20 Gbit/s speed, DisplayPort 1.2
3	DSL6540	?	2	10.7 × 10.7	2.2	Alpine Ridge	2015 Q4	40 Gbit/s, DisplayPort 1.2, PCIe 3.0, HDMI 2.0 LSPCon (DP Protocol Converter), USB 3.1, 100 W (compatible with USB Power Delivery)
3	DSL6340	?	1	10.7 × 10.7	1.7	Alpine Ridge	2015 Q1	40 Gbit/s speed, DisplayPort 1.2
3	JHL6240	Computers/Peripheral	1	10.7 × 10.7	1.2	Alpine Ridge	2016 Q2	40 Gbit/s speed, DisplayPort 1.2, lead-free
3	JHL6340	Computers/Peripheral	1	10.7 × 10.7	1.7	Alpine Ridge	2016 Q2	40 Gbit/s speed, DisplayPort 1.2, lead-free
3	JHL6540	Computers/Peripheral	2	10.7 × 10.7	2.2	Alpine Ridge	2016 Q2	40 Gbit/s speed, DisplayPort 1.2, lead-free
3	JHL7340	Computers	1	10.7 × 10.7	1.9	Titan Ridge	2018 Q1	40 Gbit/s speed, DisplayPort 1.4
3	JHL7540	Computers	2	10.7 × 10.7	2.4	Titan Ridge	2018 Q1	40 Gbit/s speed, DisplayPort 1.4
3	JHL7440	Peripheral	2	10.7 × 10.7	2.4	Titan Ridge	2018 Q1	40 Gbit/s speed, DisplayPort 1.4, optional USB-C port compatibility, backwards compatibility when a Thunderbolt 3 docking station is connected to a non-Thunderbolt 3 computer
4	JHL8140	Peripheral	1	?	2.0	Hoover Ridge	2021 Q1?	TB4/USB4 endpoint, three downstream USB‑C ports, two DisplayPort-out adapters, USB 3 hub, compatible with Thunderbolt 3. Essentially Goshen Ridge without downstream Thunderbolt or USB4 support.
4	JHL8340	Computers	1	10.7 × 10.7	?	Maple Ridge	2020 Q4	40 Gbit/s speed, USB4 compliant
4	JHL8540	Computers	2	10.7 × 10.7	?	Maple Ridge	2020 Q4	40 Gbit/s speed, USB4 compliant
4	JHL8440	Peripheral	4	10.7 × 10.7	?	Goshen Ridge	2020 Q3	40 Gbit/s speed, USB4 compliant (peripheral only), with four Thunderbolt 4 ports for branching hub topology. Tunnelling of DisplayPort 1.4, USB 3 (10 Gbit/s), PCIe (32 Gbit/s). Has PCIe 3.0 × 1 and USB 3 (10 Gbit/s) native interfaces
4	JHL9540	Computers	2	13 × 13	3.25–4	Barlow Ridge	2024 Q3	40 Gbit/s speed, USB4 v2, three DisplayPort 2.1, (Note: All speeds up to HBR3 plus UHBR10 and UHBR20. No support for UHBR13.5.) PCIe Gen 4 × 4
4	JHL9440	Peripheral	4	?	?	Barlow Ridge	2024 Q3	40 Gbit/s speed, USB4 v2, three DisplayPort 2.1, PCIe Gen 4 × 4
5	JHL9580	Computers	2	13 × 13	3.25–4	Barlow Ridge	2024 Q3	80 Gbit/s speed (also 120 ⇄ 40 Gbit/s: asymmetric), USB4 v2, three DisplayPort 2.1, PCIe Gen 4 × 4
5	JHL9480	Peripheral	4	?	?	Barlow Ridge	2024 Q3	80 Gbit/s speed (also 120 ⇄ 40 Gbit/s: asymmetric), USB4 v2, three DisplayPort 2.1, PCIe Gen 4 × 4

== See also ==
- Apple Thunderbolt Display
- Computer bus
- DisplayPort / Mini DisplayPort
- IEEE 1394 (FireWire)
- Interconnect bottleneck
- Lightning
- DockPort
- OCuLink
- List of interface bit rates
- List of computer peripheral bus bit rates
- MacBook Pro
- Optical communication
- Fiber-optic cable
- Parallel optical interface
- eGPU
- USB 3.0
- USB4
- USB-C
