= VirtualLink =

Failed USB-C alternate mode proposal

VirtualLink was a proposed USB-C Alternate Mode that was historically intended to allow the power, video, and data required to power virtual reality headsets to be delivered over a single USB-C cable instead of a set of three different cables as it was in older headsets. The standard was supported by Nvidia, AMD, HTC Vive, Oculus VR, Valve, and Microsoft. The VirtualLink Consortium was chaired by Rambo Jacoby representing Nvidia.

== VirtualLink specifications ==
According to its specifications, the VirtualLink cable consisted of:

- DisplayPort:
  - 4 × DisplayPort balanced pair data path
  - DisplayPort HPD (hot-plug detection pin) as a single wire.
  - DisplayPort AUX signal as a balanced pair
- USB 3.1 signals
  - A USB TX balanced pair for USB 3.0 data
  - A USB RX balanced pair for USB 3.0 data
- I2C wire to control the USB Billboard interface, in case the cable is plugged into an unsupported interface.
- VBUS carrying power to HMD visor
- GND ground

The USB-C plug pinout specified:

A12	A11	A10	A9	A8	A7	A6	A5	A4	A3	A2	A1
GND	DP[0]+	DP[0]−	V_{BUS}	CC1	USBTX+	USBTX−	DP[AUX]+	V_{BUS}	DP[2]−	DP[2]+	GND
GND	DP[1]+	DP[1]−	V_{BUS}	DP[AUX]−	USBRX−	USBRX+	VCONN	V_{BUS}	DP[3]−	DP[3]+	GND
B1	B2	B3	B4	B5	B6	B7	B8	B9	B10	B11	B12

Unlike most alt-modes this remapped A7, A6, B6, B7 to carry a USB 3.0 signal, instead of the usual passive USB 2.0 signal. This means that one would not be able to extend the cable using a standard USB-C 3.0 cable, which has these pins mapped only for unshielded USB 2.0 signals. Also this required the VirtualLink port to also detect the correct orientation of the USB-C plug to ensure that the USB 3.0 TX and RX lanes are correctly connected.

In VirtualLink mode, there were six high-speed lanes active in the USB-C connector and cable: four lanes transmit four DisplayPort HBR 3 video streams from the PC to the headset while two lanes implement a bidirectional USB 3.1 Gen 2 channel between the PC and the headset. Unlike the classic DisplayPort USB-C alternate mode, VirtualLink has no USB 2.0 channels active, instead providing a higher speed USB 3.1 Gen 2 (SuperSpeed+) over the same A6, A7, B7, B6 pins. VirtualLink also required the PC to provide 15 to 27 watts of power. No information pertaining to VirtualLink alternate mode compatibility with USB4 (and so Thunderbolt 3 alternate mode) had been published.

To achieve six high-speed lanes over USB-C, VirtualLink required special cables that conformed to version 1.3 of the USB-C standard and used shielded differential pairs for both USB 2.0 pairs.

The available bandwidth was estimated to be equivalent to DisplayPort 1.4 (32.4 Gbit/s, up to 4K @ 120 Hz with 8 bpc color) for video and 10 Gbit/s of USB 3.1 Gen 2 data.

== Implementation in graphics cards and devices ==
As of March 2023 Sony PSVR2 has a single 5m USB Type-C cable connection to PS5 which seems to be working with Nvidia GeForce 20 series cards as well; because, unlike most ports, VirtualLink must also provide the required 12V via USB Power Delivery, an uncommon voltage, and they additionally support standard two-lane DisplayPort alt-mode, but the PSVR2 headset does not use the actual four-lane VirtualLink alt-mode, pinout or special shielded cable.

Nvidia GeForce 20 series cards, initially released in 2018, implemented a single VirtualLink port in all RTX Founders Edition (FE) cards (2060, 2070, 2080, 2080 Ti). This port was also made available on Quadro RTX cards.

As of Nvidia's GeForce 30 series cards announcement, all of Nvidia's new Founders Edition GPUs, alongside the partner boards announced so far, lacked a VirtualLink port due to its discontinuation. By contrast, the AMD Radeon RX 6000 series, announced in October 2020, implemented a VirtualLink port for the first time.

== Discontinuation & abandonment ==
As of August 2020, the VirtualLink standard had failed to propagate into the virtual reality headset market. The Valve Index had initially developed a VirtualLink accessory, it was canceled in part due to technical signaling and reliability issues but mostly due to lack of manufacturer adopting this port. By September of that year, it had been abandoned by its consortium, and the website now redirects to its Wikipedia page.
