= USB-C =

24-pin USB connector system

USB Type‑C connector
- Illustrations of the Full-Featured Type‑C connectors (receptacle left, plug right)
- Type: Digital audio/video/data/power – connector

Production history
- Designer: USB Implementers Forum
- Designed: 11 August 2014 (published)
- Produced: 12 August 2014–present
- Superseded: All earlier USB connectors (Type‑A, ‑B, and ‑AB, and their different sizes: Standard, Mini, and Micro); DisplayPort; Mini DisplayPort; Lightning

General specifications
- Pins: 24

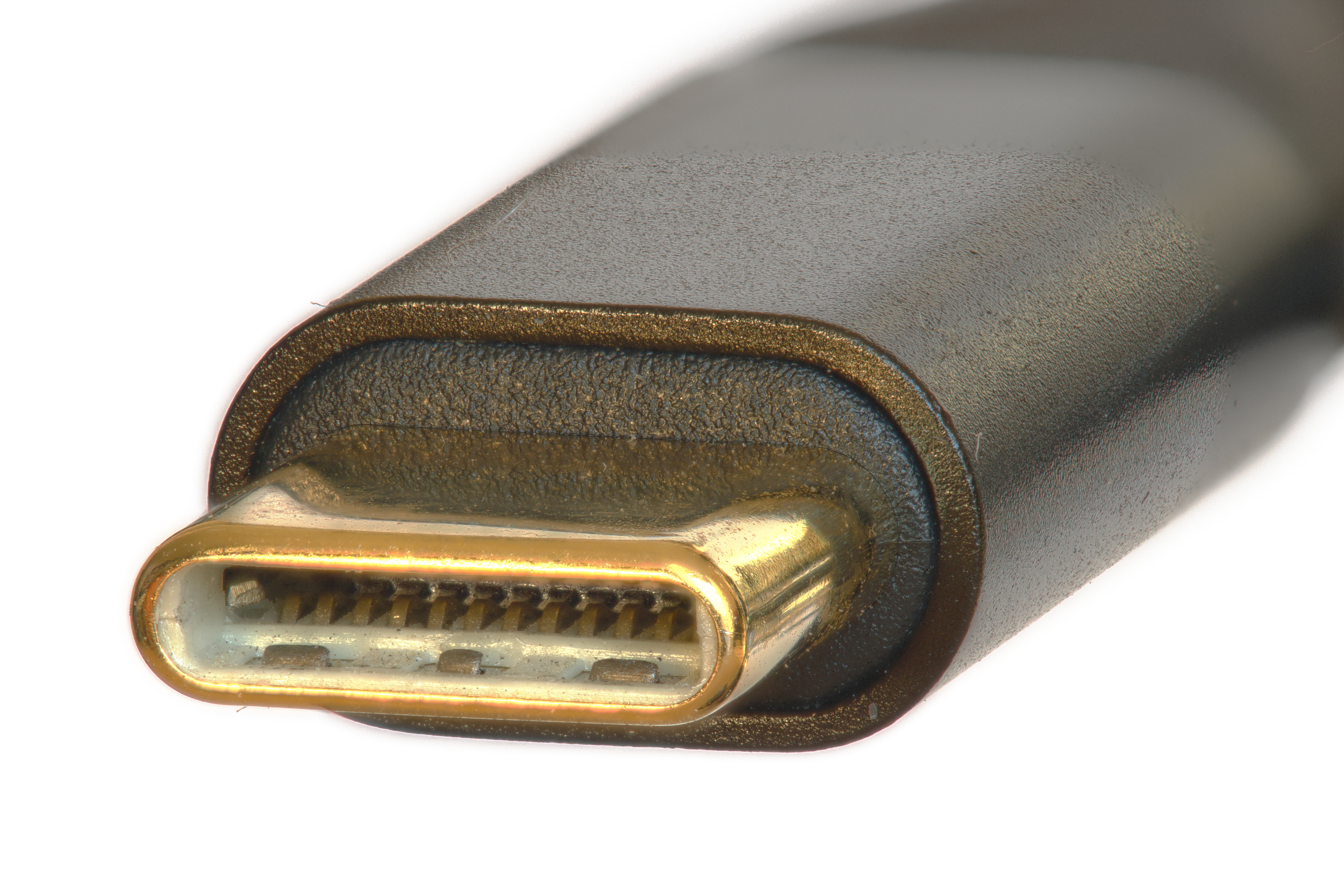
USB‑C plug

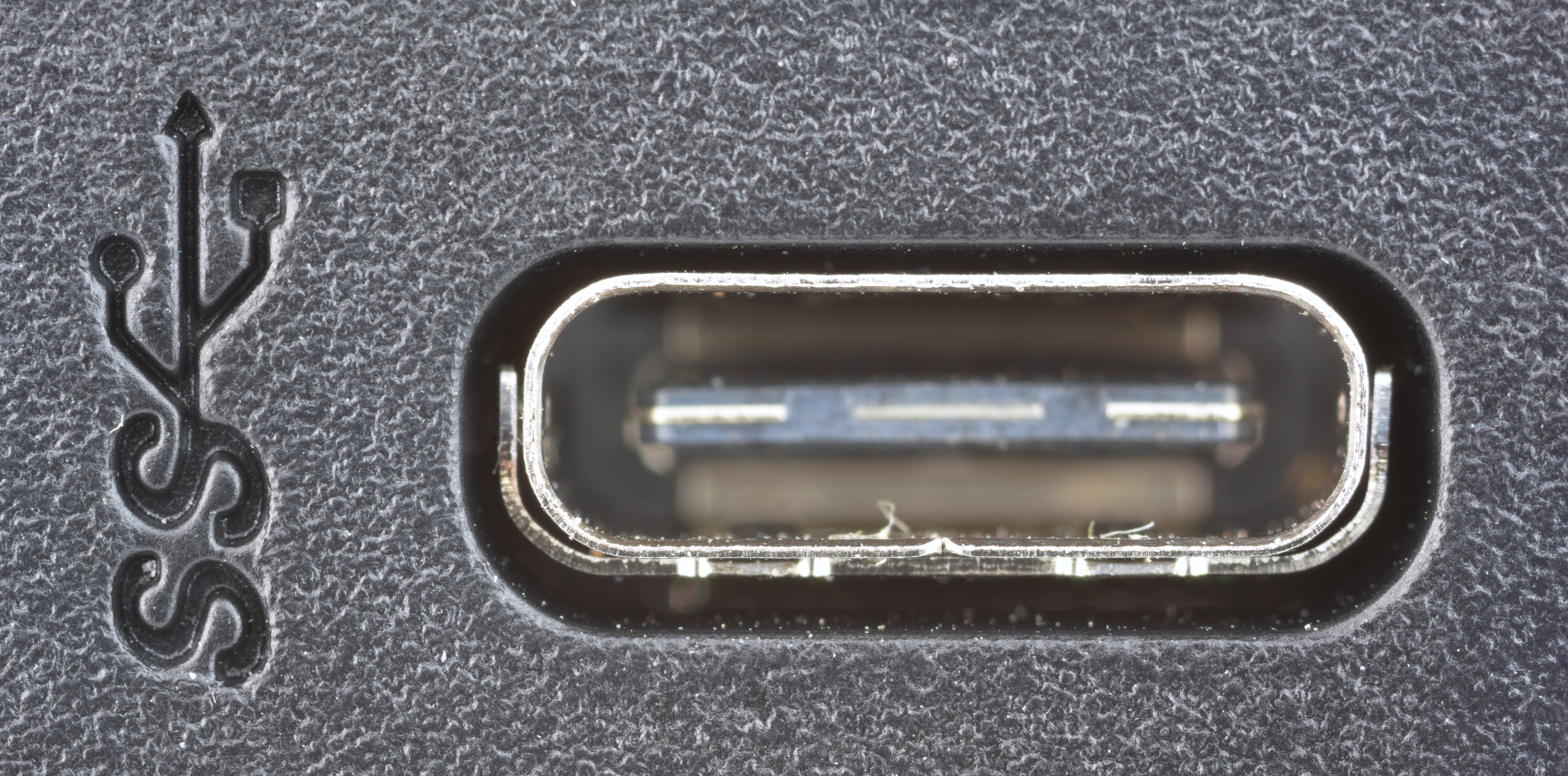
USB‑C receptacle on a laptop with the legacy SuperSpeed (usually USB 5Gbps) logo

USB‑C, or USB Type‑C, is a 24-pin reversible connector (not a protocol) that supersedes all previous USB connectors, which were designated legacy in 2014. This connector also supersedes Mini DisplayPort and Lightning connectors. USB-C is widely used for multiple purposes: exchanging data with peripheral devices, such as external drives, mobile phones, keyboards, trackpads, and mice, and between hosts; transferring A/V data to displays and speakers; and powering peripheral devices and being powered by power adapters, either through directly wired connectors or indirectly via hubs and docking stations. This connector type can be used for other data transfer protocols besides USB, such as Thunderbolt, PCIe, DisplayPort, and HDMI. It is extensible, allowing the support of future protocols.

The design for the USB‑C connector was initially developed in 2012 by members of the USB Implementers Forum, with Intel, HP Inc., and Texas Instruments being distinguished on the design document, though Apple Inc. and Microsoft, among others, also contributed. The Type‑C Specification 1.0 was published by the USB Implementers Forum (USB-IF) on 11 August 2014. In 2016 it was adopted by the International Electrotechnical Commission as IEC 62680-1-3.

The USB Type‑C connector has 24 pins and is reversible. The designation C distinguishes it from the various USB connectors it replaced, all termed Type‑A, Type‑B, or, for receptacles only, Type‑AB. Whereas every earlier valid USB cable had a host end A and a peripheral device end B, a USB‑C cable connects either way (and the devices handle the logical A–B distinction). For interoperation with older equipment, there are Type-C-to-legacy cables; such a cable has a Type‑C plug at one end and either a Type‑A (host) or a Type‑B (peripheral device) plug at the other.

The designation C (Type-C or USB-C) refers only to the connector's physical configuration, or form factor, not to be confused with a cable or port's specific capabilities and performance, such as Thunderbolt 3, DisplayPort 2.0, or USB 3.2 Gen 2×2. While USB‑C is the single modern connector for all USB protocols, there are valid uses of the connector that do not involve any USB protocol. Depending on the protocols supported by all connected devices – host, intermediate devices (hubs), and peripheral devices – a USB‑C connection can provide much higher data rates and electrical power than anything using the superseded connectors.

A device with a Type‑C connector does not necessarily implement any USB transfer protocol, USB Power Delivery, or any of the Alternate Modes: the Type‑C connector is common to several technologies while mandating only a few of them.

USB 3.2, released in September 2017, fully replaced the USB 3.1 (and therefore also USB 3.0) specifications. It preserves the former USB 3.1 SuperSpeed and SuperSpeedPlus architectures and protocols, with transfer rates of 5 and 10 Gbit/s, and introduces two two-lane operational modes with the same signalling rates in each lane, doubling the transfer rates to 10 and 20 Gbit/s. These are only applicable with Full-Featured USB‑C cables and hosts, hubs, and peripheral devices that use them.

Jurisdictions with legal requirements of USB-C power ports for most 5–20 V (maximum 100 W) consumer devices

The USB4 specification, released in 2019, is the first USB protocol standard that is applicable exclusively via USB‑C.

== Ease of use ==
The USB‑C standard simplifies usage by specifying cables having identical plugs on both ends; orientation is moot. Also, the plugs are flat but can be inserted in either orientation.

=== Symmetry ===
- Mechanically, USB‑C receptacles have two-fold rotational symmetry – a plug may be inserted into a receptacle in either of two orientations.
- Electrically, USB‑C plugs are not symmetrical, as can be seen in the tables of pin layouts. Also, some contacts are wired straight through and some are crossed over, as shown in the table of cable wiring.
- Though a Type‑C–Type‑C cable is symmetrical, the connected devices still have logical host (A) and peripheral device (B) roles. If both devices are only capable of the same role, no damage occurs but no link is established; if both devices are capable of both roles, they negotiate to determine which takes which role. Determination of this host-to-peripheral-device relationship is accomplished through a Configuration Channel (CC) that is connected through the cable.

=== Universal application ===
The USB‑C standard attempts to eliminate the need to have different cables for other communication technologies, such as Thunderbolt, PCIe, HDMI, DisplayPort and more. Since the introduction in 2014, many companies have adopted the USB‑C standard into their products. USB‑C cables can contain circuit boards and processors, giving them much more capability than simple circuit connections.

== Overview ==
USB‑C cables interconnect hosts and peripheral devices, replacing various other electrical cables and connectors, including all earlier (legacy) USB connectors, HDMI connectors, DisplayPort connectors, and 3.5 mm audio jacks.

USB Type‑C and USB‑C are trademarks of the USB Implementers Forum, Inc.

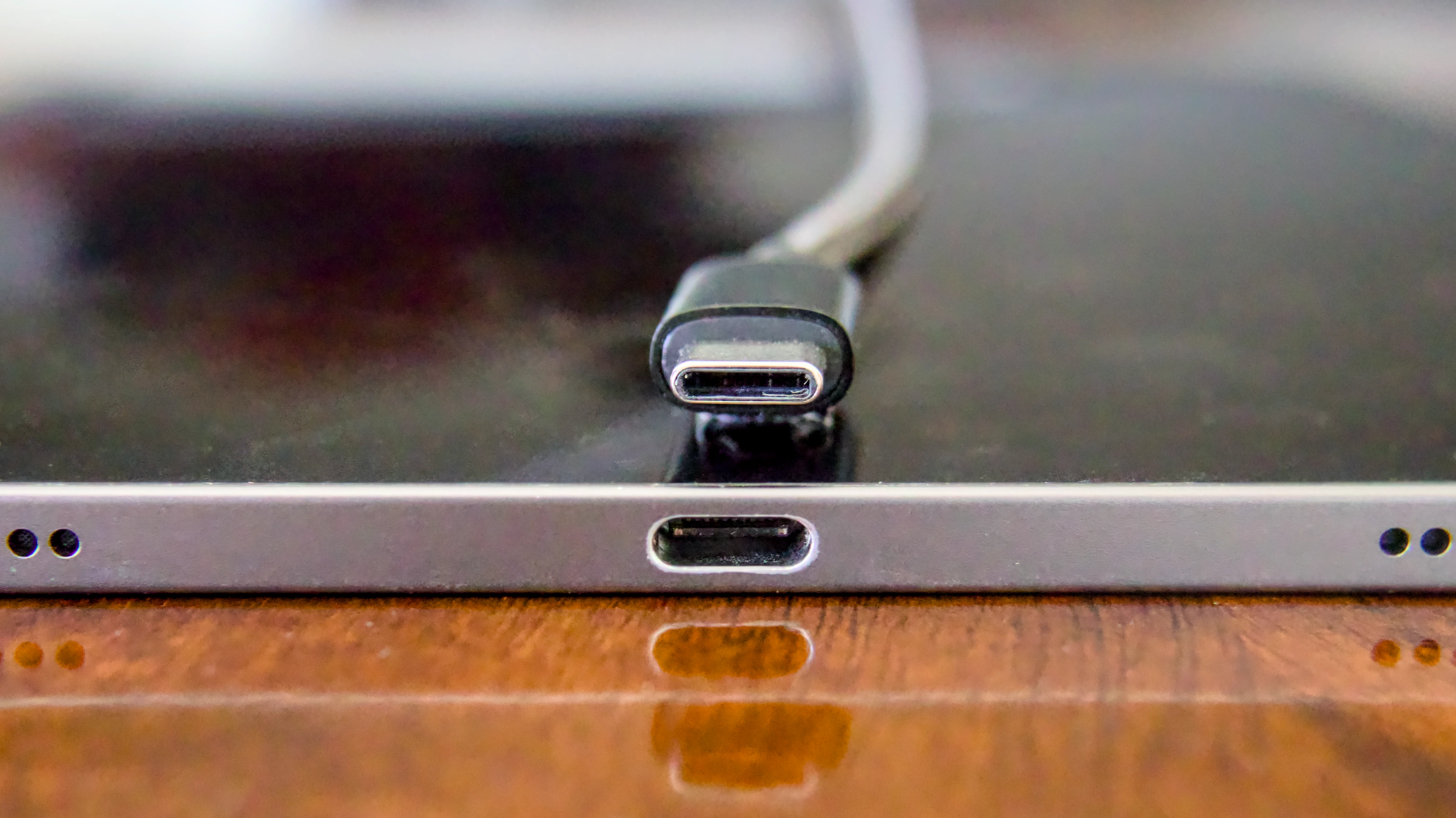
USB-C plug and receptacle on an iPad Pro

The 24-pin double-sided connector is slightly larger than the non-SuperSpeed, USB 2.0 Micro connectors, with a USB‑C receptacle opening measuring 8.34 mm × 2.56 mm, 6.20 mm deep.

=== Cables ===
Type‑C cables can be split among various categories and subcategories. The first one is USB 2.0 vs Full-Featured. USB 2.0 Type‑C cables have very limited wires and are only good for USB 1 and USB 2 communications and Power Delivery. They are also called charging cables colloquially. Conversely, Full-Featured cables need to have all wires populated and in general support Alternate Modes, and they are further distinguished by their speed ratings.

Full-Featured cables exist in different speed grades. Their technical names, the operation modes, use the Gen x notation, each higher number expressing increasing capabilities in terms of data rate. The marketing names are based on the nominal data rates: "USB 5Gbps", "USB 10Gbps", "USB 20Gbps", "USB 40Gbps", and so on. Full-Featured cables can support at least USB 3.x, USB Power Delivery and DisplayPort.

A Gen 1 (signalling rate of 5 Gbit/s) cable supports the Gen 1 rate on each of its two lanes (2 × 2 twisted data wire pairs). It can be used to establish a USB 3.2 Gen 1×2 operation mode with nominally 10 Gbit/s (2 × 5 Gbit/s) between two devices capable of USB 3.2 or later connected with a Full-Featured USB-C cable.

According to the USB4 1.0 and 2.0 specifications, implementation of the USB 3.2 Gen 2×2 operation mode, resulting in nominally 20 Gbit/s, is optional; indeed most USB4 controllers do not implement it. In other words, the "USB 20Gbps" will only be achieved by a USB4 or more modern version of an operation mode, such as USB4 Gen 2×2, with USB4-capable devices and Full-Featured USB-C cables (and intermediate hubs) of a rate of "USB 20Gbps" (i.e. all four twisted data-wire pairs are wired) or higher between a host and a peripheral device.

The USB Implementers Forum certifies valid cables so they can be marked accordingly with the official logos and users can distinguish them from non-compliant products. There have been simplifications in the logos. Previous logos and names also referenced specific USB protocols like SuperSpeed for the USB 3 family of connections or USB4 directly. The current official names and logos have removed those references as most full-featured cables can be used for USB4 connections as well as USB 3 connections.

In order to achieve greater cable lengths, cable variants with active electronics to amplify the signals also exist. The Type‑C standard mostly mandates that these active cables behave similarly to passive cables with vast backwards compatibility, but they are not required to support all possible features and typically have no forward compatibility to future standards. Optical cables are even allowed to further reduce the backwards compatibility. For example, an active cable may not be able to use all high-speed wire pairs in the same direction (as used for DisplayPort connections) but only in the symmetric combinations expected by classic USB connections. Passive cables have no such limitations.

==== Power Delivery ====
Every USB‑C cable must support at least three amps of current and up to 20 volts, for up to 60 watts of power, according to the USB Power Delivery (PD) specification. Cables were also allowed to support up to 5 A while retaining the 20 V limit, allowing up to 100 W of power; however, the 20 V limit for 5 A cables has been deprecated in favor of 48 V. The combination of 48 V support and 5 A current support is called Extended Power Range (EPR) and allows for up to 240 W (48 V × 5 A) of power according to the USB PD specification.

==== eMarker ====
Each Type‑C cable except the most basic, supporting only up to USB 2.0 and 60 W (20 V × 3 A), must contain electronics, called an eMarker in the standard, that identify the cable and its capabilities via the Configuration Channel (CC). This identification data includes information about product and vendor, cable connectors, supported USB signalling protocols (USB 2.0, USB 3.x, etc), passive vs active construction, use of V_{CONN} power, available V_{BUS} voltages and currents, latency, transmit vs receive directionality, SOP controller mode, and hardware and firmware versions. It also can include further vendor-defined messages (VDM) that detail support for Alternate Modes or vendor-specific functionality outside of the USB standards.

=== Hosts and peripheral devices ===
For any two pieces of equipment connecting over USB, one is a host (with a downstream-facing port, DFP) and the other is a peripheral device (with an upstream-facing port, UFP). Some products, such as some mobile phones, can take either role, whichever is opposite that of the connected equipment. Such equipment is said to have Dual-Role-Data (DRD) capability, which was known as USB On-The-Go in earlier specifications. With USB‑C, when two such devices are connected, the roles are first randomly assigned, but a swap can be commanded from either end, although there are optional path and role detection methods that would allow equipment to select a preference for a specific role. Furthermore, Dual-Role equipment that implements USB Power Delivery may swap data and power roles independently using the Data Role Swap and Power Role Swap processes. This allows for charge-through hub and docking station applications such as a portable computer acting as a host to connect to peripherals but being powered by the dock, or a computer being powered by a display, through a single USB‑C cable.

USB‑C devices may optionally provide or consume bus power currents of 1.5 A and 3.0 A (at 5 V) in addition to baseline bus power provision; power sources can either advertise increased USB current through the configuration channel or implement the full USB Power Delivery specification using both the BMC-coded configuration line and the legacy BFSK-coded V_{BUS} line.

All USB connectors aside from Type-C (that is, all 23 Standard, Mini, and Micro connectors, or, equivalently, all 23 Type‑A, Type‑B, and Type‑AB connectors) are designated legacy. Connecting legacy and modern, USB‑C equipment requires either a legacy cable assembly (a cable with either Standard‑A plug or any Type‑B plug at one end and a Type‑C plug at the other) or, in very specific cases, a legacy adapter assembly.

An older device can connect to a modern (USB‑C) host by using a legacy cable with a Type-C plug on the host (A) end and any Type-B plug (Standard-B, Mini-B, or Micro-B) on the peripheral (B) end. Similarly, a modern peripheral device can connect to a legacy host by using a legacy cable with a USB‑C plug on the peripheral device (B) end and a (USB 2 or USB 3) Standard-A plug on the host (A) end. Legacy adapters with USB‑C receptacles are "not defined or allowed" by the specification because they can create "many invalid and potentially unsafe" cable combinations (being generally any cable assembly with two A ends or two B ends). However, exactly two types of USB adapters with Type‑C plugs are defined: An adapter with a USB 3 Standard‑A receptacle (for connecting a legacy device to a modern host, supporting up to 10 Gbit/s), and one with a Micro‑B receptacle (for connecting a modern device to a legacy host or power supply, supporting up to USB 2).

=== Non-USB modes ===
==== Liquid Corrosion Mitigation Mode ====
This is an optional mode that aims to reduce the risk of corrosion within the Type-C port by driving voltages down as close as possible to zero.

==== Debug Accessory Mode ====
This mode can be used for both high-level and low-level debugging purposes. For embedded devices this can be used to allow access to e.g. a JTAG Test Access Port without having to open the casing of a device. It is designed for usage both within LAB and within production environments. Basic debug requirements are defined as a standard feature and are therefore present in all compliant devices. A vendor may add debug features as required. The spec demands the assurance by the vendor that an explicit user authorization and the actual vendor specific implementation do not compromise system security or user privacy. Also noteworthy is that detecting the orientation of the cable is optional for this mode, meaning it may only work when the cable is plugged in in a given orientation but not in the reverse.

To enter this mode the device needs to detect both CC pins being terminated using pull-up, or both with pull-down, resistors. Because this mode uses both CC pins a receptacle-to-receptacle connection using a compliant Type-C-to-Type-C cable cannot be detected. This is because the spec does not allow USB-C cables to connect both CC wires through and requires that CC2, a.k.a. V_{CONN}, be isolated instead. Therefore, a captive cable (that is, one in which one end either is hard-wired or has a proprietary connector), a directly attaching device (something that connects without a cable), or a non-compliant cable that connects both CC contacts through is needed.

==== Alternate modes ====
An Alternate Mode dedicates some of the physical wires in a USB‑C cable for direct device-to-host transmission using non-USB data protocols, such as DisplayPort or Thunderbolt. The four high-speed lanes, two side-band pins, and (for devices that connect directly or with captive cables) five additional pins can be used for Alternate Mode purposes. The modes are configured using vendor-defined messages (VDMs) through the configuration channel.

==== Audio Adapter Accessory Mode (deprecated) ====
Deprecated in October 2024, with the Type‑C Cable and Connector Specification version 2.3, to allow for the new Liquid Corrosion Mitigation Mode, this mode allowed a device with a Type‑C receptacle to support analog headsets directly through a passive audio adapter with a 3.5 mm jack, providing three analog audio channels (left and right output and a monaural microphone input). Unlike superficially similar Lightning adapters, which handle all analog conversion and audio amplification internally, the adapters that used this Accessory Mode contained no electronics and required that the host device have all the additional components to handle analog audio – digital-to-analog converters and amplifiers for audio output and an analog-to-digital converter to handle the analog microphone signal. Such an adapter could optionally include a USB‑C charge-through port to allow 500 mA device charging. The engineering specification states that an analog headset shall not use a USB‑C plug instead of a 3.5 mm plug. In other words, a headset with a USB‑C plug must always support digital audio (but optionally could support the Accessory Mode).

Analog signals used the USB 2.0 differential pair contacts (Dp and Dn for right and left) and the two Sideband Use (SBU) contacts for microphone and ground. The presence of the audio accessory was signaled through the configuration channel and V_{CONN}.

With the deprecation of Audio Adapter Accessory Mode, the Type-C specification strongly recommends using USB Audio Device Class 4.0 while also recommending version 2.0.

== Specifications ==
=== USB Type‑C cable and connector specifications ===
The USB Type‑C specification, release 1.0, was published by the USB Implementers Forum (USB-IF) and was finalized in August 2014.

It defines requirements for cables and connectors.

- Release 1.1 was published 2015-04-03.
- Release 1.2 was published 2016-03-25.
- Release 1.3 was published 2017-07-14.
- Release 1.4 was published 2019-03-29.
- Release 2.0 was published 2019-08-29, primarily for enabling USB4.
- Release 2.1 was published 2021-05-25, primarily for enabling the USB Power Delivery Extended Power Range: 240 W (as 48 V × 5 A).
- Release 2.2 was published 2022-10-18, primarily for enabling USB 80Gbps (USB4 Version 2.0).
- Release 2.3 was published 2023-10-31, primarily for deprecating the Audio Adapter Accessory Mode and replacing it with the Liquid Corrosion Mitigation Mode, and for updating the Multi-port Charger Shared Capacity definition and behaviors.
- Release 2.4 was published 2024-10-21.
- Release 2.5 was published 2026-03.

Adoption as IEC specification:

- IEC 62680-1-3:2016 (2016-08-17, edition 1.0) "Universal serial bus interfaces for data and power – Part 1-3: Universal Serial Bus interfaces – Common components – USB Type‑C cable and connector specification"
- IEC 62680-1-3:2017 (2017-09-25, edition 2.0) "Universal serial bus interfaces for data and power – Part 1-3: Common components – USB Type‑C Cable and Connector Specification"
- IEC 62680-1-3:2018 (2018-05-24, edition 3.0) "Universal serial bus interfaces for data and power – Part 1-3: Common components – USB Type‑C Cable and Connector Specification"

==== Receptacles ====
Type‑C receptacle pinout (end-on view)

The receptacle features four power and four ground pins, two differential pairs (connected together on devices) for legacy USB 1 (1.5 and 12 Mbit/s half-duplex) and 2 (480 Mbit/s half-duplex) data, four shielded differential pairs for modern USB 3 and USB4 data (5, 10, 20, or 40 Gbit/s each), two Sideband Use (SBU) pins, and two Configuration Channel (CC) pins.

Type‑C receptacle A-pin layout
Pin	Name	Description
A1	GND	Ground return
A2	SSTXp1 ("TX1+")	SuperSpeed differential pair #1, transmit, positive
A3	SSTXn1 ("TX1−")	SuperSpeed differential pair #1, transmit, negative
A4	V_{BUS}	Bus power
A5	CC1	Configuration channel
A6	D+	USB 2.0 differential pair, position 1, positive
A7	D−	USB 2.0 differential pair, position 1, negative
A8	SBU1	Sideband use (SBU)
A9	V_{BUS}	Bus power
A10	SSRXn2 ("RX2−")	SuperSpeed differential pair #4, receive, negative
A11	SSRXp2 ("RX2+")	SuperSpeed differential pair #4, receive, positive
A12	GND	Ground return

Type‑C receptacle B-pin layout
Pin	Name	Description
B12	GND	Ground return
B11	SSRXp1 ("RX1+")	SuperSpeed differential pair #2, receive, positive
B10	SSRXn1 ("RX1−")	SuperSpeed differential pair #2, receive, negative
B9	V_{BUS}	Bus power
B8	SBU2	Sideband use (SBU)
B7	D−	USB 2.0 differential pair, position 2, negative (Note: In USB-C cables, the differential pair for legacy, non-SuperSpeed data is wired only to pins A6 and A7, while B6 and B7 are absent or unwired. In the receptacle A6 and B6, and A7 and B7, are wired together; therefore the plug's orientation does not matter, connecting the plug's legacy data pair (A6, A7) either to the receptacle's A6 and A7 or, equivalently, to its B6 and B7.)
B6	D+	USB 2.0 differential pair, position 2, positive
B5	CC2	Configuration channel
B4	V_{BUS}	Bus power
B3	SSTXn2 ("TX2−")	SuperSpeed differential pair #3, transmit, negative
B2	SSTXp2 ("TX2+")	SuperSpeed differential pair #3, transmit, positive
B1	GND	Ground return

==== Plugs ====
Type‑C plug pinout (end-on view)

The plug has only one USB 2.0 high-speed differential pair, and one of the Configuration Channel pins (CC2) is replaced by V_{CONN}, to power optional electronics in the cable, and the other is used to actually carry the Configuration Channel signals. These signals are used to determine the orientation of the cable as well as to carry USB Power Delivery communications.

==== Cables ====
Although plugs have 24 pins, cables commonly have only 18 wires. In the following table, the "No." column shows the wire number as assigned within the spec. It is allowed to use multiple wires instead of a single wire. The spec does not demand having two GND and V_{BUS} wires even though it allocated a wire number for them. Note that within the plugs all of the V_{BUS} wires must be joined together. The same is true for all of the GND wires (including shielding).

Full-Featured and USB 2.0 Type‑C cable assembly wiring
Plug 1		Cable					Plug 2	
Pin	Name	Wire color	No.	Name	Description	2.0 (Note: USB 2.0 Type‑C cables do not include wires for SuperSpeed or sideband use.)	Pin	Name
Shell (Note: All GND wires and shielding must be connected together)	Shield	Braid	Braid	Shield	Cable external braid	Yes	Shell	Shield
A1, B12, B1, A12	GND	Tin-plated	1	GND_PWRrt1	Ground for power return	Yes	A1, B12, B1, A12	GND
A1, B12, B1, A12	GND	Tin-plated	16	GND_PWRrt2 (optional)	Ground for power return	Yes	A1, B12, B1, A12	GND
A4, B9, B4, A9 (Note: All V_{BUS} wires must be connected together)	V_{BUS}	Red	2	PWR_V_{BUS}1	V_{BUS} power	Yes	A4, B9, B4, A9	V_{BUS}
A4, B9, B4, A9	V_{BUS}	Red	17	PWR_V_{BUS}2 (optional)	V_{BUS} power	Yes	A4, B9, B4, A9	V_{BUS}
B5	V_{CONN}	Yellow	18	PWR_V_{CONN} (optional)	V_{CONN} power, for powered cables (Note: V_{CONN} must not traverse end-to-end through the cable. Some isolation method must be used. Can also be terminated directly within the plugs at both ends without a connecting wire in between. There are exceptions for cases where the USB-C wire is directly connected to a device at one end to allow these devices to be powered through V_{CONN}. Thereby it is basically the active component within the cable which allows to work around the restriction of USB-C cables not being allowed to Backfeed power V_{CONN} into connected devices.)	Yes	B5	V_{CONN}
A5	CC	Blue	3	CC	Configuration channel	Yes	A5	CC
A6	D+	Green	4	UTP_Dp (Note: There is only a single differential pair for non-SuperSpeed data in the cable, which is connected to A6 and A7. Contacts B6 and B7 should not be present in the plug.)	Unshielded twisted pair, positive	Yes	A6	D+
A7	D−	White	5	UTP_Dn	Unshielded twisted pair, negative	Yes	A7	D−
A8	SBU1	Red	14	SBU_A	Sideband use A	No	B8	SBU2
B8	SBU2	Black	15	SBU_B	Sideband use B	No	A8	SBU1
A2	SSTXp1	Yellow (Note: Wire colors for differential pairs are not mandated.)	6	SDPp1	Shielded differential pair #1, positive	No	B11	SSRXp1
A3	SSTXn1	Brown	7	SDPn1	Shielded differential pair #1, negative	No	B10	SSRXn1
B11	SSRXp1	Green	8	SDPp2	Shielded differential pair #2, positive	No	A2	SSTXp1
B10	SSRXn1	Orange	9	SDPn2	Shielded differential pair #2, negative	No	A3	SSTXn1
B2	SSTXp2	White	10	SDPp3	Shielded differential pair #3, positive	No	A11	SSRXp2
B3	SSTXn2	Black	11	SDPn3	Shielded differential pair #3, negative	No	A10	SSRXn2
A11	SSRXp2	Red	12	SDPp4	Shielded differential pair #4, positive	No	B2	SSTXp2
A10	SSRXn2	Blue	13	SDPn4	Shielded differential pair #4, negative	No	B3	SSTXn2

=== Related USB-IF specifications ===
USB Type‑C Locking Connector Specification
The USB Type‑C Locking Connector Specification was published 2016-03-09. It defines the mechanical requirements for USB‑C plug connectors and the guidelines for the USB‑C receptacle mounting configuration to provide a standardized screw lock mechanism for USB‑C connectors and cables.

USB Type‑C Port Controller Interface Specification
The USB Type‑C Port Controller Interface Specification was published 2017-10-01. It defines a common interface from a USB‑C Port Manager to a simple USB‑C Port Controller.

USB Type‑C Authentication Specification
Adopted as IEC specification: IEC 62680-1-4:2018 (2018-04-10) "Universal Serial Bus interfaces for data and power – Part 1-4: Common components – USB Type-C Authentication Specification"

USB 2.0 Billboard Device Class Specification
USB 2.0 Billboard Device Class is defined to communicate the details of supported Alternate Modes to the computer host OS. It provides user readable strings with product description and user support information. Billboard messages can be used to identify incompatible connections made by users. They optionally appear to negotiate multiple Alternate Modes and must appear when negotiation fails between the host (source) and device (sink).

USB Audio Device Class 3.0 Specification
USB Audio Device Class 3.0 defines powered digital audio headsets with a USB‑C plug. The standard supports the transfer of both digital and analog audio signals over the USB port.

USB Power Delivery Specification
While it is not necessary for USB‑C compliant devices to implement USB Power Delivery (USB PD), for USB‑C Dual-Role-Power (DRP) and Dual-Role-Data (DRD) ports, USB Power Delivery introduces commands for altering a port's power or data role after the roles have been established.

USB 3.2 Specification
USB 3.2, released in September 2017, replaces the USB 3.1 specification. It preserves existing USB 3.1 SuperSpeed and SuperSpeed+ data modes and introduces two new SuperSpeed+ transfer modes over the USB‑C connector using two-lane operation, doubling the signalling rates to 10 and 20 Gbit/s (raw data rate 1 and ~2.4 GB/s).

USB4 Specification
The USB4 specification released in 2019 is the first USB data transfer specification to be exclusively applicable by the Type‑C connector.

=== Alternate Mode partner specifications ===
As of 2018, five system-defined Alternate Mode partner specifications exist. Additionally, vendors may support proprietary modes for use in dock solutions. Alternate Modes are optional; Type‑C features and devices are not required to support any specific Alternate Mode, nor are they required to support USB (though some standards using Alternate Modes, such as Thunderbolt, require that all compatible ports support USB communications as well). The USB Implementers Forum is working with its Alternate Mode partners to make sure that ports are properly labelled with respective logos.

List of Alternate Mode partner specifications
Logo	Name	Date	Protocol	Status
	Thunderbolt Alternate Mode	Announced in June 2015	USB‑C is the native (and only) connector for Thunderbolt 3 and later Thunderbolt 3 (also carries 4× PCI Express 3.0, DisplayPort 1.2, DisplayPort 1.4, USB 3.1 Gen 2), Thunderbolt 4 (also carries 4× PCI Express 3.0, DisplayPort 2.0, USB4), Thunderbolt 5 (also carries 4× PCI Express 4.0, DisplayPort 2.1, USB4)	Current
	DisplayPort Alternate Mode	Published in September 2014	DisplayPort 1.2, DisplayPort 1.4, DisplayPort 2.0	Current
	Mobile High-Definition Link (MHL) Alternate Mode	Announced in November 2014	MHL 1.0, 2.0, 3.0 and superMHL 1.0	Current
	HDMI Alternate Mode	Announced in September 2016	HDMI 1.4b	Not being updated
	VirtualLink Alternate Mode	Announced in July 2018	VirtualLink 1.0	Abandoned

Other protocols, like Ethernet, have been proposed, although Thunderbolt 3 and later are also capable of 10 Gigabit Ethernet networking.

All Thunderbolt 3 controllers support both Thunderbolt Alternate Mode and DisplayPort Alternate Mode. Because Thunderbolt can encapsulate DisplayPort data, every Thunderbolt controller can output DisplayPort signals either directly over DisplayPort Alternate Mode or encapsulated within Thunderbolt in Thunderbolt Alternate Mode. Low-cost peripherals mostly connect via DisplayPort Alternate Mode while some docking stations tunnel DisplayPort over Thunderbolt.

DisplayPort Alternate Mode does not support DisplayPort Dual-Mode (DP++), which allows DisplayPort sources to output HDMI-compatible signals. As a result, USB Type‑C-to-HDMI adapters or cables which use DisplayPort Alternate Mode must incorporate active conversion circuitry. DisplayPort Alternate Mode 2.0: DisplayPort 2.0 can run directly over USB‑C alongside USB4. DisplayPort 2.0 can support 8K resolution at 60 Hz with HDR10 color and can use up to 80 Gbps, which is double the amount available to USB data.

As of 2023 there were no known USB Type-C-to-HDMI adapters using HDMI Alternate Mode, according to the HDMI Licensing Association.

The USB SuperSpeed protocol is similar to DisplayPort and PCIe/Thunderbolt, in using packetized data transmitted over differential LVDS lanes with embedded clock using comparable bit rates, so these Alternate Modes are easier to implement in the chipset.

Alternate Mode hosts and peripheral devices can be connected with either regular Full-Featured Type‑C cables, or with converter cables or adapters:

USB 3.1 Type‑C to Type‑C Full-Featured cable
DisplayPort, Mobile High-Definition Link (MHL), HDMI and Thunderbolt (20 Gbit/s, or 40 Gbit/s with cable length up to 0.5 m) Alternate Mode Type‑C ports can be interconnected with standard passive Full-Featured USB Type‑C cables. These cables are only marked with standard "trident" SuperSpeed USB logo (for Gen 1 mode only) or the SuperSpeed+ USB 10 Gbit/s logo on both ends. Cable length should be 2.0 m or less for Gen 1 and 1.0 m or less for Gen 2.
Thunderbolt Type‑C to Type‑C active cable
Thunderbolt 3 (40 Gbit/s) Alternate Mode with cables longer than 0.8 m requires active Type‑C cables that are certified and electronically marked for high-speed Thunderbolt 3 transmission, similarly to high-power 5 A cables. These cables are marked with a Thunderbolt logo on both ends. They do not support USB 3 backwards compatibility, only USB 2 or Thunderbolt. Cables can be marked for both Thunderbolt and 5 A power delivery at the same time.

Active cables and adapters contain powered electronics to allow for longer cables or to perform protocol conversion. The adapters for video Alternate Modes may allow conversion from native video stream to other video interface standards (e.g., DisplayPort, HDMI, VGA or DVI).

Using Full-Featured Type‑C cables for Alternate Mode connections provides some benefits. Alternate Mode does not employ USB 2.0 lanes and the configuration channel lane, so USB 2.0 and USB Power Delivery protocols are always available. In addition, DisplayPort and MHL Alternate Modes can transmit on one, two, or four SuperSpeed lanes, so two of the remaining lanes may be used to simultaneously transmit USB 3.1 data.

Alternate Mode protocol support matrix for Type‑C cables and adapters
Mode	USB 3.1 Type‑C cable (Note: USB 2.0 and USB Power Delivery are available at all times in a Type‑C cable)							Adapter cable or adapter					Construction
Mode	USB (Note: USB 3.1 can be transmitted simultaneously when the video signal bandwidth requires two or fewer lanes.)	DisplayPort		Thunderbolt		superMHL	HDMI	HDMI		DVI-D		Component video	Construction
Mode	3.1	1.2	1.4	20 Gbit/s	40 Gbit/s	superMHL	1.4b	1.4b	2.0b	Single-link	Dual-link	(YPbPr, VGA/DVI-A)	Construction
DisplayPort	Yes	Yes		—N/a				No					Passive
DisplayPort	—N/a	Optional		—N/a				Yes		Yes		Yes	Active
Thunderbolt	Yes (Note: Is only available in Thunderbolt 3 DisplayPort mode)	Yes		Yes	Yes (Note: Thunderbolt 3 40 Gbit/s passive cables are only possible <0.8 m due to limitations of current cable technology.)	—N/a		No					Passive
Thunderbolt	—N/a	Optional		Optional	Yes	—N/a		Yes		Yes		Yes	Active
MHL	Yes	—N/a				Yes	—N/a	Yes	No	Yes	No	No	Passive
MHL	—N/a	—N/a				Optional	—N/a	—N/a	Yes	—N/a		Yes	Active
HDMI	—N/a						Yes	Yes	No	Yes	No	No	Passive
HDMI	—N/a						Optional	—N/a				Yes	Active

== USB‑C receptacle pin usage in different modes ==
The diagrams below depict the pins of a USB‑C receptacle in different use cases.

=== USB 2.0/1.1 ===
A simple USB 2.0/1.1 device mates using one pair of D+/D− pins. Hence, the source (host) does not require any connection management circuitry, but it lacks the same physical connector so therefore USB‑C is not backward compatible. V_{BUS} and GND provide 5 V up to 500 mA of current.

However, to connect a USB 2.0/1.1 device to a USB‑C host, use of pull-down resistors Rd on the CC pins is required, as the source (host) will not supply V_{BUS} until a connection is detected through the CC pins.

GND	TX1+	TX1−	V_{BUS}	CC1	D+	D−	SBU1	V_{BUS}	RX2−	RX2+	GND
GND	RX1+	RX1−	V_{BUS}	SBU2	D−	D+	CC2	V_{BUS}	TX2−	TX2+	GND

=== USB Power Delivery ===
The USB Power Delivery specification uses one the CC pins for power negotiation between source device and sink device. It is transparent to any data transmission mode and can therefore be used together with any of them as long as the CC pins are intact.

An extension to the specification has added 28 V, 36 V and 48 V to support up to 240 W of power.

GND	TX1+	TX1−	V_{BUS}	CC1	D+	D−	SBU1	V_{BUS}	RX2−	RX2+	GND
GND	RX1+	RX1−	V_{BUS}	SBU2	D−	D+	CC2	V_{BUS}	TX2−	TX2+	GND

=== USB 3.2 ===
In the USB 3.2 mode, two or four high speed links are used in TX/RX pairs to provide 5, 10, or 20 Gbit/s (only by USB 3.2 two-lane operations) signalling rates respectively. One of the CC pins is used to negotiate the mode.

V_{BUS} and GND provide 5 V up to 900 mA, in accordance with the USB 3.1 specification. A specific USB‑C mode may also be entered, where 5 V at nominal either 1.5 A or 3 A is provided. A third alternative is to establish a USB Power Delivery (USB‑PD) contract.

In single-lane mode, only the differential pairs closest to the CC pin are used for data transmission. For dual-lane data transfers, all four differential pairs are in use.

The D+/D− link for USB 2.0/1.1 is typically not used when a USB 3.x connection is active, but devices like hubs open simultaneous 2.0 and 3.x uplinks in order to allow operation of both types of devices connected to it. Other devices may have the ability to fall back to 2.0, in case the 3.x connection fails. For this, it is important that SS and HS lanes are correctly aligned so that e.g. operating system messages indicating overcurrent conditions report the correct shared USB plug.

GND	TX1+	TX1−	V_{BUS}	CC1	D+	D−	SBU1	V_{BUS}	RX2−	RX2+	GND
GND	RX1+	RX1−	V_{BUS}	SBU2	D−	D+	CC2	V_{BUS}	TX2−	TX2+	GND

=== Alternate Modes ===
In Alternate Modes one of up to four high speed links are used in whatever direction is needed. SBU1, SBU2 provide an additional lower speed link. If two high speed links remain unused, then a USB 3.2 link can be established concurrently to the Alternate Mode. One of the CC pins is used to perform all the negotiation. An additional low band bidirectional channel (other than SBU) may share that CC pin as well. USB 2.0 is also available through D+/D− pins.

In regard to power, the devices are supposed to negotiate a Power Delivery contract before an Alternate Mode is entered.

GND	TX1+	TX1−	V_{BUS}	CC1	D+	D−	SBU1	V_{BUS}	RX2−	RX2+	GND
GND	RX1+	RX1−	V_{BUS}	SBU2	D−	D+	CC2	V_{BUS}	TX2−	TX2+	GND

=== Debug Accessory Mode ===
The external device test system (DTS) signals to the target system (TS) to enter debug accessory mode via CC1 and CC2 both being pulled down with an Rd resistor value or pulled up as Rp resistor value from the test plug (Rp and Rd defined in Type‑C specification).

After entering debug accessory mode, optional orientation detection via the CC1 and CC2 is done via setting CC1 as a pullup of Rd resistance and CC2 pulled to ground via Ra resistance (from the test system Type‑C plug). While optional, orientation detection is required if USB Power Delivery communication is to remain functional.

In this mode, all digital circuits are disconnected from the connector, and the 14 bold pins can be used to expose debug related signals (e.g. JTAG interface). USB IF requires for certification that security and privacy consideration and precaution has been taken and that the user has actually requested that debug test mode be performed.

GND	TX1+	TX1−	V_{BUS}	CC1	D+	D−	SBU1	V_{BUS}	RX2−	RX2+	GND
GND	RX1+	RX1−	V_{BUS}	SBU2	D−	D+	CC2	V_{BUS}	TX2−	TX2+	GND

If a reversible Type‑C cable is required but Power Delivery support is not, the test plug will need to be arranged as below, with CC1 and CC2 both being pulled down with an Rd resistor value or pulled up as Rp resistor value from the test plug:

GND	TS1	TS2	V_{BUS}	CC1	TS6	TS7	TS5	V_{BUS}	TS4	TS3	GND
GND	TS3	TS4	V_{BUS}	TS5	TS7	TS6	CC2	V_{BUS}	TS2	TS1	GND

This mirroring of test signals will only provide seven test signals for debug usage instead of fourteen, but with the benefit of minimizing extra parts count for orientation detection.

=== Audio Adapter Accessory Mode ===
This mode was deprecated in 2023 to allow for Liquid Corrosion Mitigation Mode. In Audio Adapter Accessory Mode all digital circuits were disconnected and certain pins were reassigned for analog outputs or inputs. The mode, where supported, was invoked when both CC pins were shorted to GND. D− and D+ became audio output left (L) and right (R), respectively. The SBU pins became a microphone pin (MIC) and the analog audio ground (AGND), the latter being a return path for both outputs and the microphone. Nevertheless, the MIC and AGND pins had to have automatic swap capability for two reasons: firstly, the USB‑C plug could be inserted in either orientation; secondly, there was no agreement which TRRS contacts should be GND and MIC, so devices equipped with a headphone jack with microphone input must be able to perform this swap anyway.

This mode also allowed concurrent charging of a device exposing the analog audio interface (through V_{BUS} and GND), however, only at 5 V and 500 mA, as CC pins were unavailable for any negotiation.

GND	TX1+	TX1−	V_{BUS}	CC1	R	L	MIC	V_{BUS}	RX2−	RX2+	GND
GND	RX1+	RX1−	V_{BUS}	AGND	L	R	CC2	V_{BUS}	TX2−	TX2+	GND

Plug insertions detection is performed by the TRRS plug's physical plug detection switch. On plug insertions, this will pull down both CC and VCONN in the plug (CC1 and CC2 in the receptacle). This resistance must be less than 800 ohms, the minimum "Ra" resistance specified in the USB Type‑C specification). This is essentially a direct connection to USB digital ground.

TRRS contact wiring to Type‑C plug (Figure A-2 of USB Type‑C Cable and Connector Specification Release 1.3)
TRRS socket	Analog audio signal	USB Type‑C plug
Tip	L	D−
Ring 1	R	D+
Ring 2	Microphone/ground	SBU1 or SBU2
Sleeve	Microphone/ground	SBU2 or SBU1
DETECT1	Plug presence detection switch	CC, VCONN
DETECT2	Plug presence detection switch	GND

== Software support ==
- Android from version 6.0 "Marshmallow" onwards works with USB 3.1 and USB‑C.
- ChromeOS, starting with the Chromebook Pixel 2015, supports USB 3.1, USB‑C, Alternate Modes, Power Delivery, and USB Dual-Role support.
- FreeBSD released the Extensible Host Controller Interface, supporting USB 3.0, with release 8.2
- iOS first supported USB‑C with version 12.1-12.4.1 on iPad Pro (3rd generation). Support returned with version 17.0 or later with iPhone 15 or later.
- iPadOS supports USB‑C on iPad Pro (3rd generation) or later, iPad Air (4th generation) or later, iPad Mini (6th generation) or later, and iPad (10th generation) or later.
- NetBSD began supporting USB 3.0 with release 7.2
- Linux has supported USB 3.0 since kernel version 2.6.31 and USB version 3.1 since kernel version 4.6.
- OpenBSD began supporting USB 3.0 in version 5.7
- macOS supports USB‑C with USB 3.1, USB‑C, Alternate Modes, and Power Delivery on OS X Yosemite 10.10.2 or later on MacBook (Early 2015) or later, MacBook Air (2018) or later, MacBook Pro (2016) or later, Mac mini (2018) or later, iMac (2017) or later, iMac Pro, Mac Studio, and Mac Pro (2019) or later.
- Windows 8.1 added USB‑C and billboard support in an update.
- Windows 10 and Windows 10 Mobile support USB 3.1, USB‑C, Alternate Modes, Billboard Device Class, Power Delivery and USB Dual-Role.

== Hardware support ==
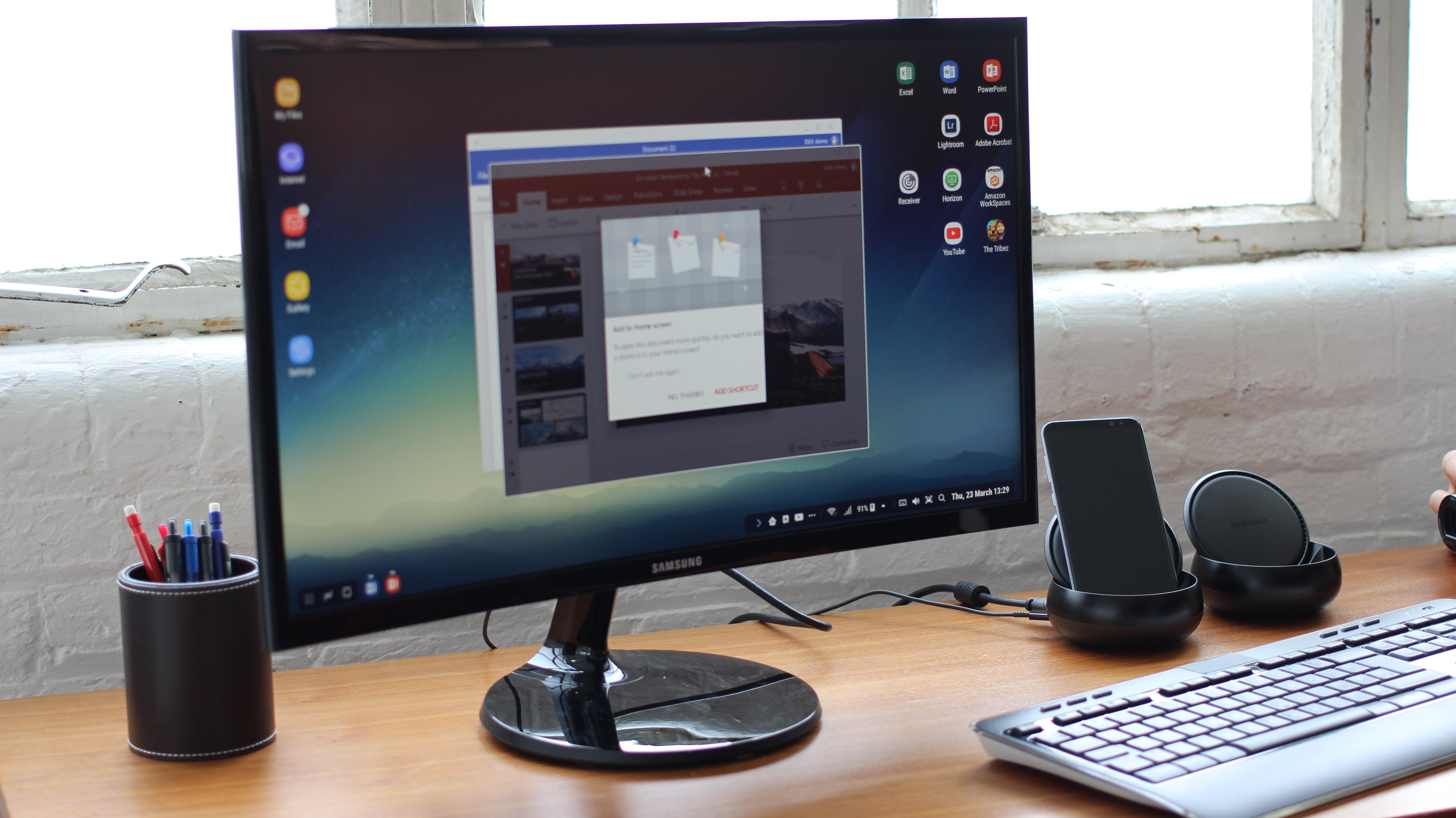
A Samsung Galaxy S8 plugged into a DeX docking station: The monitor is displaying the PowerPoint and Word Android applications.

=== USB‑C devices ===
An increasing number of motherboards, notebooks, tablet computers, smartphones, hard disk drives, USB hubs and other devices released from 2014 onwards include the USB‑C receptacles. However, the initial adoption of USB‑C was limited by the high cost of USB‑C cables and the wide use of Micro-USB chargers.

==== Video output ====
A USB‑C multiport adapter converts the device's native video stream to DisplayPort/HDMI/VGA, allowing it to be displayed on an external display, such as a television set or computer monitor.

It is also used on USB‑C docks designed to connect a device to a power source, external display, USB hub, and optional extra (such as a network port) with a single cable. These functions are sometimes implemented directly into the display instead of a separate dock, meaning a user connects their device to the display via USB‑C with no other connections required.

=== Compatibility issues ===
==== Power issues with cables ====
Many cables claiming to support USB‑C are actually not compliant to the standard. These cables can, potentially, damage a device. There are reported cases of laptops being destroyed due to the use of non-compliant cables.

Some non-compliant cables with a USB‑C connector on one end and a legacy USB‑A plug or Micro-B receptacle (receptacles also usually being invalid on cables, but see known exceptions in the sections on Hosts and peripheral devices and, formerly, Audio Adapter Accessory Mode above) on the other end fail to be, or incorrectly terminate the Configuration Channel (CC) with a 10 kΩ pull-up to V_{BUS} instead of the specification-mandated 56 kΩ pull-up, causing a device connected to the cable to incorrectly determine the amount of power it is permitted to draw from the cable. Cables with this issue may not work properly with certain products, including Apple and Google products, and may even damage power sources such as chargers, hubs, or PC USB ports.

A defective USB‑C cable or power source can cause a USB‑C device to see an incorrect and different "declared" voltage than what the source will actually deliver. This may result in an overvoltage on the VBUS pin.

Also due to the fine pitch of the USB‑C receptacle, the VBUS pin from the cable may contact with the CC pin of the USB‑C receptacle resulting in a short-to-VBUS electrical issue due to the fact that the VBUS pin is rated up to 20 V while the CC pins are rated up to 5.5 V.

To overcome these issues, USB Type‑C port protection must be used between a USB‑C connector and a USB‑C Power Delivery controller.

==== Compatibility with audio adapters ====
The USB‑C port can be used to connect wired accessories such as headphones.

There are two modes of audio output from devices: digital and analog. There are primarily two types of USB‑C audio adapters: active, e.g. those with digital-to-analog converters (DACs), and passive, without electronics.

When an active set of USB‑C headphones or adapter is used, digital audio is sent through the USB‑C port. The conversion by the DAC and amplifier is done inside of the headphones or adapter, instead of on the phone. The sound quality is dependent on the headphones/adapter's DAC. Active adapters with a built-in DAC have near-universal support for devices that output digital and analog audio, adhering to the Audio Device Class 3.0 and Audio Adapter Accessory Mode specifications.

Examples of such active adapters include external USB sound cards and DACs that do not require special drivers, and USB‑C to 3.5 mm headphone jack adapters by Apple, Google, Essential, Razer, HTC, and Samsung.

On the other hand, when a passive adapter is used, digital-to-analog conversion is done on the host device and analog audio is sent through the USB‑C port. The sound quality is dependent on the phone's onboard DAC. Passive adapters are only compatible with devices that output analog audio, adhering to the Audio Adapter Accessory Mode specification.

USB‑C to 3.5 mm audio adapters and USB sound cards compatibility
Output mode	Specification	Devices	USB‑C adapters	
Output mode	Specification	Devices	Active	Passive, without DACs
Digital audio	Audio Device Class 3.0 (digital audio)	Apple iPhone 15, Google Pixel 2, HTC U11, Essential Phone, Razer Phone, Samsung Galaxy Note 10, Samsung Galaxy S10 Lite, Sharp Aquos S2, Asus ZenFone 3, Bluedio T4S, Lenovo Tab 4, GoPro, MacBook	No conversion	Conversion unavailable
Analog audio	Audio Device Class 3.0 (digital audio); Audio Adapter Accessory Mode (analog audio)	Apple iPhone 15, Moto Z/Z Force, Moto Z2/Z2 Force/Z2 Play, Moto Z3/Z3 Play, Sony Xperia XZ2, Huawei Mate 10 Pro, Huawei P20/P20 Pro, Honor Magic2, LeEco, Xiaomi phones, OnePlus 6T, OnePlus 7/7 Pro/7T/7T Pro, Oppo Find X/Oppo R17/R17 Pro, ZTE Nubia Z17/Z18	Conversion by adapter	Pass-through

==== Compatibility with other fast-charging technology ====
In 2016, Benson Leung, an engineer at Google, pointed out that Quick Charge 2.0 and 3.0 technologies developed by Qualcomm are not compatible with the USB‑C standard. Qualcomm responded that it is possible to make fast-charge solutions fit the voltage demands of USB‑C and that there are no reports of problems; however, it did not address the standard compliance issue at that time. Later in the year, Qualcomm released Quick Charge 4, which it claimed was – as an advancement over previous generations – "USB Type‑C and USB PD compliant".

==== Regulations for compatibility ====
In 2021, the European Commission proposed the use of USB‑C as a universal charging interface. On 4 October 2022, the European Parliament voted in favor of the new law, Radio Equipment Directive 2022/2380, with 602 votes in favor, 13 against and 8 abstentions. The regulation requires that all new mobile phones, tablets, cameras, headphones, headsets, handheld video game consoles, portable speakers, e-readers, keyboards, mice, portable navigation systems, and earbuds sold in the European Union and supporting wired charging, would have to be equipped with a USB‑C port and charge with a standard USB‑C cable by the end of 2024. Additionally, if these devices support fast charging, they must support USB Power Delivery. These regulations will extend to laptops by early 2026. To comply with these regulations, Apple Inc. replaced its proprietary Lightning connector with USB‑C beginning with the iPhone 15 and AirPods Pro second generation, released in 2023.

In late December 2024, new EU regulations took effect, mandating USB‑C charging ports for all small and medium-sized electronic devices sold in the EU, with laptops following on 28 April 2026. These rules were aimed at reducing waste and saving €250 million annually for consumers. Apple, which initially opposed the changes, had since adopted USB‑C for its products. Additionally, consumers can opt not to receive a new charger with their device.

== Security ==
=== Authentication ===
USB Type‑C Authentication is an extension to the USB‑C protocol which can add security to the protocol.

== See also ==
- GPMI – Digital audiovisual data interface
- HDMI – Digital audiovisual data interface
  - HDMI § Version 2.1
- Thunderbolt (interface) – Computer hardware interface
- USB hardware – Communication connector using the USB protocol
  - USB hardware § Host and device interface receptacles
