= Xiaomi YU7 =

Battery electric mid-size SUV

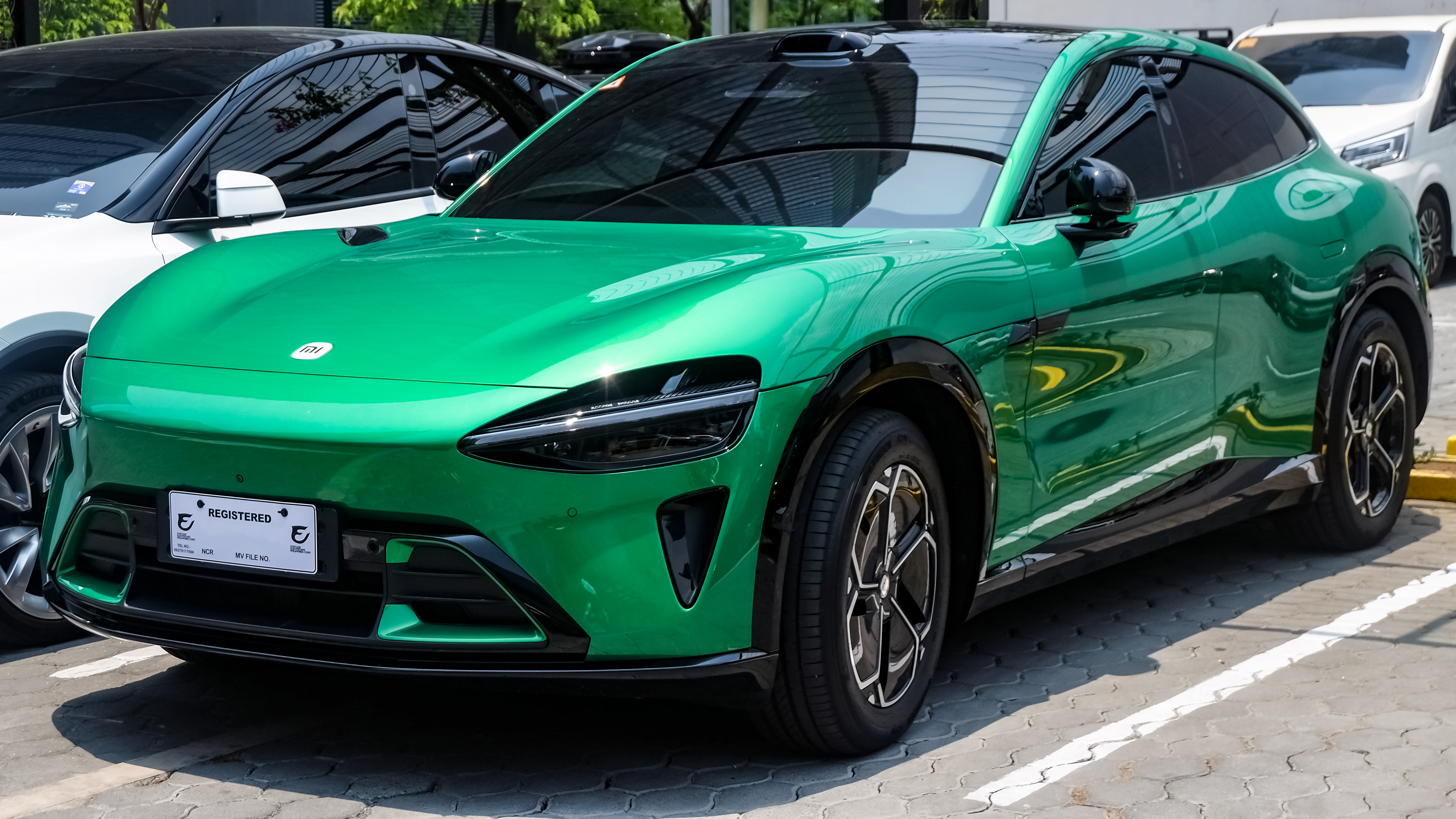

Overview
- Manufacturer: Xiaomi Auto
- Model code: MX11
- Production: June 2025 – present
- Assembly: China: Beijing (Xiaomi F2 plant)
- Designer: Sawyer Li (chief designer)

Body and chassis
- Class: Mid-size SUV
- Body style: 5-door coupe SUV
- Layout: Rear-motor, rear-wheel-drive; Dual-motor, all-wheel-drive
- Platform: Modena
- Related: Xiaomi SU7

Powertrain
- Electric motor: Xiaomi HyperEngine V6s Plus
- Power output: 235–508 kW (315–681 hp; 320–691 PS)
- Battery: 96.3 kWh LFP FinDreams/CATL; 101.7 kWh NMC Qilin CATL
- Electric range: 760–835 km (472–519 mi) (CLTC)
- Plug-in charging: 5.2C

Dimensions
- Wheelbase: 3,000 mm (118.1 in)
- Length: 4,999 mm (196.8 in)
- Width: 1,996 mm (78.6 in)
- Height: 1,600 mm (63.0 in)
- Curb weight: 2,140–2,460 kg (4,718–5,423 lb)

The Xiaomi YU7 (Chinese: 小米YU7; pinyin: Xiǎomǐ YU7) is a battery electric mid-size SUV developed by Xiaomi Auto, the electric vehicle subsidiary of the Chinese consumer electronics company Xiaomi. It is Xiaomi's second vehicle following the SU7, and is the brand's first SUV.

According to Xiaomi's announcement of 28 March 2025, the Chinese pronunciation of YU7 is "小米御7" (pinyin:xiǎomǐ yùqī), where "御" (pinyin:"yù") means "land chariot, riding the wind". The YU7 is available in three variants: YU7, YU7 Pro, and YU7 Max.

The YU7 is expected to become the biggest threat to the Tesla Model Y's dominance of the premium electric crossover segment in China, of which it was the sales leader in the segment since its introduction to the Chinese market in 2021.

== Background ==
In mid-2024, development mules of the YU7 were spotted undergoing testing and various spy shots appeared online.

On 9 December 2024 Xiaomi revealed exterior images of the YU7 with an intended official launch timeframe in mid-2025; additionally, some specifications and images of the vehicle were revealed via public homologation documents to China's MIIT. Xiaomi representatives said that the company homologated the vehicle several months earlier than necessary to test the vehicle in public without camouflage, allowing for better testing of NVH characteristics, powertrain efficiency and range, and overall durability.

The YU7 will be manufactured at Xiaomi's F2 EV factory in Yizhuang, Beijing, construction of which started in August 2024 and is scheduled to reach completion by July 2025.

After releasing images of the interior the day before, on the evening of 22 May 2025, Xiaomi held a product launch event, where it released two products, the Xiaomi 15S Pro and the Xiaomi Pad 7 Ultra, both equipped with Xiaomi's in-house SOC chip XRING O1. At the same time, the YU7 was also pre-released for the first time. It was first available for public viewing at Auto Shenzhen 2025 in early June, with display models appearing in stores days after. The vehicle's launch was brought forward to 26 June, after it was originally announced to be in July 2025 at the May reveal.

The YU7 was launched at a Xiaomi full-ecosystem product event on the evening of 26 June 2025 with pre-orders opening soon after its conclusion. Initial deliveries of limited quantities of pre-made models began in July, with mass production of customized orders expected to begin in August.

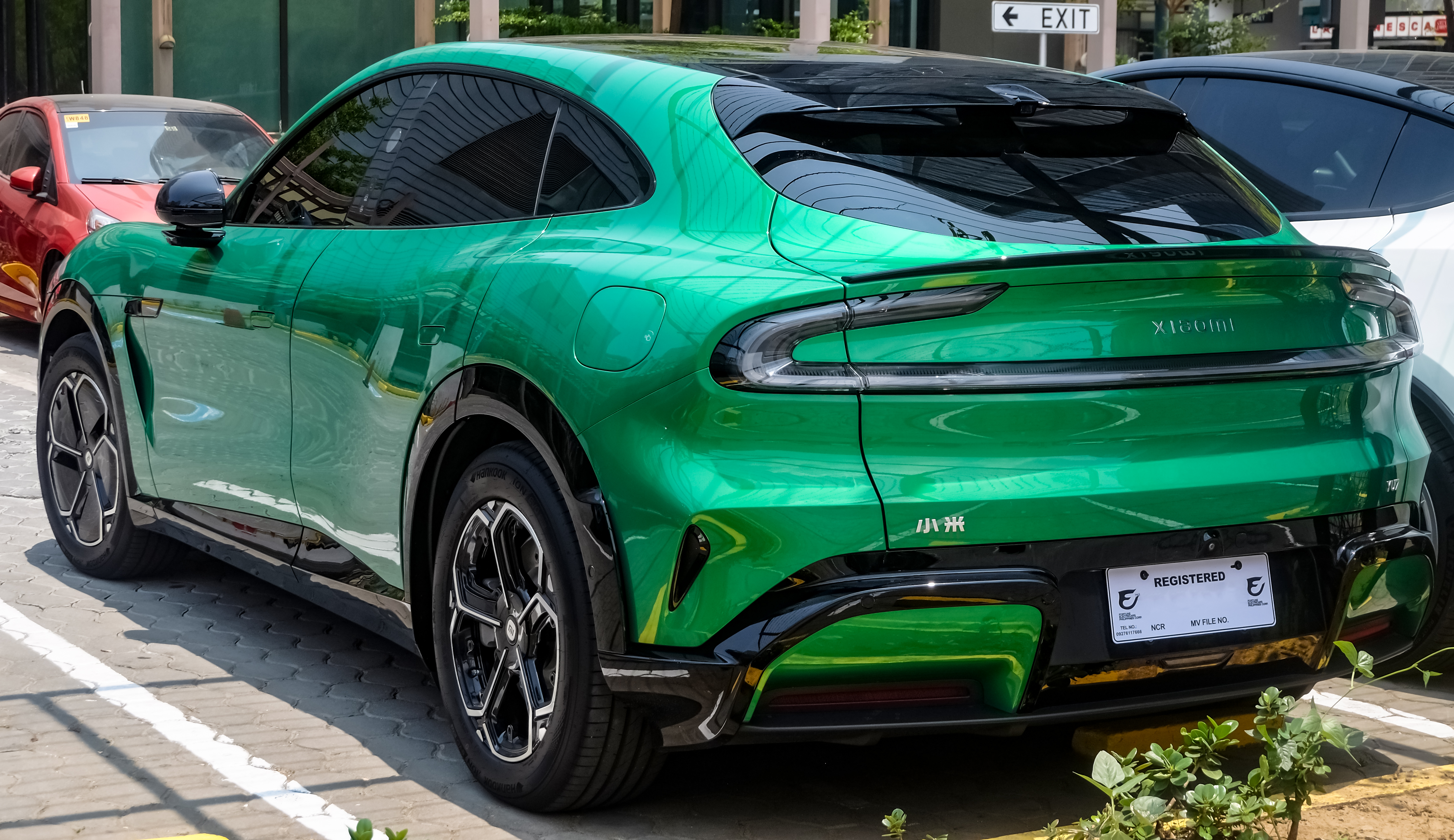
Rear view

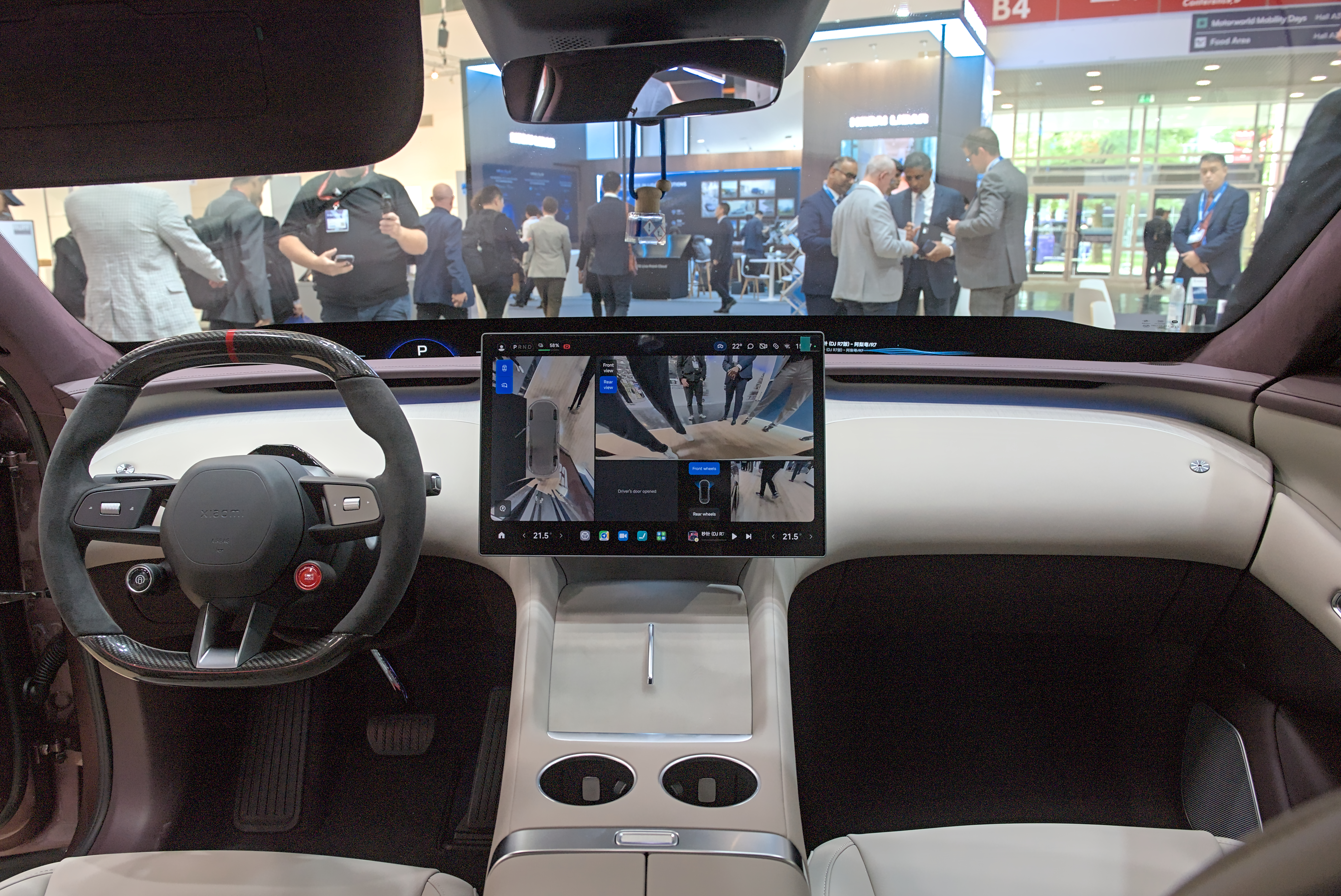
Interior

== Specifications ==
The YU7 is a 5.0-metre (16.4 ft) long mid-large SUV built on Xiaomi's Modena platform shared with the SU7 sedan. Xiaomi says it has an extra long L113 dimension, distance between the front axle and brake pedal, of 680 mm (26.8 in). Xiaomi says the vehicle underwent 539 days of real-world road testing covering a total of 6,490,000 km (4,030,000 mi), and for a total of 10,620,000 km (6,600,000 mi) of all testing covered by 653 test cars. The YU7 Max covered 3,944 km (2,451 mi) in a 24-hour endurance test with speeds exceeding 210 km/h (130 mph), intended to challenge high speed efficiency, long battery life, fast charging, and cooling.

=== Exterior ===
The front consists of a lower air intake flanked by air curtain vents. A vent above the headlights leads to an exit farther down the clamshell hood near the windshield. Xiaomi claims that clamshell hood, which measures 1,960 mm × 1,587 mm (77.2 in × 62.5 in), is the largest aluminium hood on a mass-produced vehicle at 3.11 m^{2} (33.5 sq ft), and reduces the drag coefficient by 2 counts and is almost half the weight of a conventional steel design. The doors have flush door handles which are illuminated and use an inward-folding mechanism, and can be unlocked using a smartphone's UWB connection. It also has frameless side mirrors and six wheel options with 19 to 21-inch sizes. The rear features a sloping design with a wing-type spoiler ahead of a 22° ducktail lip spoiler which integrates the taillights, which follow a similar strip design as the SU7. It is available in nine colors including Emerald Green Metallic, Lava Orange, Titanium Silver Metallic, and Pearl White. Xiaomi says the YU7-exclusive Emerald Green Metallic paint color is inspired by Columbian emeralds and is painted through a double-layer spraying process involving three different metallic and pearlescent paints.

Xiaomi says it made over 40 aerodynamic optimizations which reduced drag by 78 counts to 0.245 C_{d}, increasing range on the CLTC test cycle by 59 kilometres (37 mi). This includes 18 counts from active grille shutters which increases range by 14 kilometres (8.7 mi) alone, 15 counts for the rear spoilers, respectively, and 20 counts from wheel well vents, spats, and spoke design.

=== Interior ===
In the interior, the sparse dashboard has a 1.1-metre (43 in) wide 'HyperVision' panoramic head-up display, whose reflection is positioned below the clear area of the windshield, along with a 16.1-inch 3K center infotainment touchscreen and hidden air vents. The HyperVision display consists of three mini-LED panels with 108-PPD resolution, capable of up to 1200 nits of brightness, and has 903-zone full-array local dimming, which serves as the instrument cluster, and can show blind-spot cameras, sensor information, media details, and more through customizable widgets. All displays are powered by a Qualcomm Snapdragon 8 Gen 3 SoC, which Xiaomi says allows for 1.35-second boot-up times and OTA update installation in as little as 15 minutes.

The two-tone steering wheel uses roller wheels and button controls, and has drive mode and autonomous driving mode selection controls mounted low on the center hub, while the shifter is column-mounted. Below the center infotainment display, the center console has two active-cooled 80-watt wireless charging pads, behind which are two circular cupholders and a split-opening storage compartment door; the back has a removable 6.68-inch touchscreen for rear passengers to access climate, seat, media, and navigation controls. The center console also contains an optional 4.6-litre (0.16 cu ft) 2–50 °C (36–122 °F) temperature controlled compartment. It is equipped with a standard 14-speaker or an optional 25-speaker sound system with Dolby Atmos and capable of active noise cancellation, and the standard 1.7 m^{2} (18 sq ft) sunroof has an optional dimming feature. The YU7 comes standard with a magnetic tissue dispenser box located behind the center infotainment display.

The seats are upholstered in standard leatherette or optional Nappa leather and the cabin received a OEKO-TEX Class 1 certification. The front seats have a 10-point massage function and a 'zero-gravity' 123° recline mode, while the rear seats have power-adjustable backrest angle between 100–135°. The interior is available in three color options: Twilight Blue, Coral Orange, and dual-tone Stone Grey with Pine Green.

The YU7 has 678-litre (23.9 cu ft) rear cargo capacity which expands to 1,758-litre (62.1 cu ft) with the rear seats folded down, and is supplemented by a 141-litre (5.0 cu ft) frunk. It has a 5.2-litre (0.18 cu ft) storage drawer located underneath the rear seats.

=== Technology ===
The YU7 has a magnetic wireless button which can be stuck to any of the nine magnetic locations throughout the cabin, and can be customized to carry out any of over 130 functions through the infotainment system. Additional buttons can be used simultaneously with different assigned functions, and is designed to still function outside the vehicle such as from inside a home as long as the signal range is not exceeded. The magnetized points throughout the cabin are also compatible with first-party magnetized accessories such as a glasses holder.

Like the SU7, the YU7 has several ¼-inch threaded accessory mounting points and first-party accessories, such as a physical control array compatible with the infotainment system, and points on the dashboard for accessories such as wireless charging phone holders and dashcams, which now have dedicated 27-watt USB-C sockets to supply power. Additionally, the rear cargo area has a ceiling-mounted 144-watt powered accessory rail, which is compatible with accessories such as a projector or a detachable light which automatically lights when the trunk is open through tight software integration. Xiaomi has opened the accessory ecosystem to other automakers, with BYD, GAC Toyota and Zhengzhou Nissan being the first to join.

The YU7 has a voice assistant that can use the user's location within the vehicle contextualize its actions, and can also be used outside the vehicle such as for opening the frunk. Xiaomi extended compatibility of software features to Apple devices, such as home screen widgets and action buttons, CarPlay, and UWB compatibility on iPhones, and iPad integration for rear passenger controls for functions such as HVAC settings or seat recline.

All variants of the YU7 are equipped with Xiaomi's supervised semiautonomous driving system called Xiaomi HAD. All variants use the same sensor suite, including one roof-mounted 128-line Hesai LiDAR with a 200-metre (660 ft) range, one 4D mmWave radar, 11 cameras, and 12 ultrasonic sensors, and use an NVIDIA DRIVE AGX Thor-U chip capable of 700 TOPS.

The YU7 has a 4-in-1 computing module which combines the ADAS chips and sensors, infotainment system hardware, external communications including dual 5G chips, and vehicle domain controller onto two motherboards inside a single integrated package. Xiaomi says this design reduces the number of ECUs by 75%, reduces space occupied by 57%, and reduces weight by 47% from 6.85 kg (15.1 lb) to 3.6 kg (7.9 lb). Additionally, it reduces the entire system's power consumption, which Xiaomi claims increases range by 14 kilometres (8.7 mi). In the vehicle's sentinel mode, Xiaomi says the system's power consumption is reduced by 40%.

=== Chassis ===
The YU7 has a double wishbone front and five-link independent rear suspension, and all versions of have continuous damping control, while the Pro and Max versions also have dual-chamber air suspension with 75 mm (3.0 in) of height adjustment and over 40% stiffness adjustment. The 19-inch wheels are paired with 245/55 R19 tires, and the YU7 is compatible with 21-inch wheels with 275/40 R21 tires at the rear. The Max variant is equipped with 4-piston fixed-caliper Brembo brakes, and can stop from 100 km/h (62 mph) in 33.9 metres (111 ft).

The YU7's chassis consists of 90.2% high-strength steel and aluminium, and has a torsional rigidity of 47,610 N·m/deg. It has a 659 mm (25.9 in) frontal crumple zone which features a 20-in-1 integrated aluminium die cast impact attenuator located between the front-wheel strut towers, and tubular reinforcement beams made from Xiaomi's self-developed 2,200 MPa (320 ksi) proprietary steel alloy in the front and rear doors, which strengthens the A- and B-pillars by a claimed 25% and 70.5%, respectively. It also has a large die-cast three-section rear subframe, and a claimed 'bulletproof coating' shared with the SU7 Ultra on the battery pack. Xiaomi says that the YU7 passes over 50 crash tests meeting or exceeding all C-NCAP and C-IASI standards.

== Xiaomi YU7 GT ==
In April 2026, Xiaomi CEO Lei Jun previewed some information about the Xiaomi YU7 GT at this year's Beijing Auto Show. The model is officially positioned as a "sports car-level SUV that combines long-distance travel and driving pleasure" and launched in China on 21 May 2026.

The "GT" in YU7 GT comes from the Italian word "Gran Turismo", which translates to "Great Journey" in Chinese. It represents a "high-performance car suitable for long-distance travel".

The production version of the YU7 GT was unveiled by photos from the MIIT on 6 February 2026. The YU7 GT packs a dual-motor powertrain with a 288 kW (386 hp; 392 PS) front motor and a 450 kW (603 hp; 612 PS) rear motor, combining for a total output of 990 hp (738 kW; 1,004 PS). It has an acceleration from 0 to 97 km/h (60 mph) in 2.92 seconds and a claimed top speed of 300 km/h (190 mph). It uses the same 101.7 kWh battery pack as the YU7 Max and has a range of up to 705 km (438 mi) on the CLTC cycle.

In April 2026, the YU7 GT with Track Package, which removed the rear seats and fitted with roll cage, claimed an SUV lap record on the Nürburgring Nordschleife at the time of 7:34.931, beating Audi RS Q8's lap time of 7:36.69. The record was broken again in the following month, with an updated time of 7:22.755. On 22 June, the YU7 GT set the world's first Nürburgring lap record for an autonomous vehicle, with a time of 10:29.483.

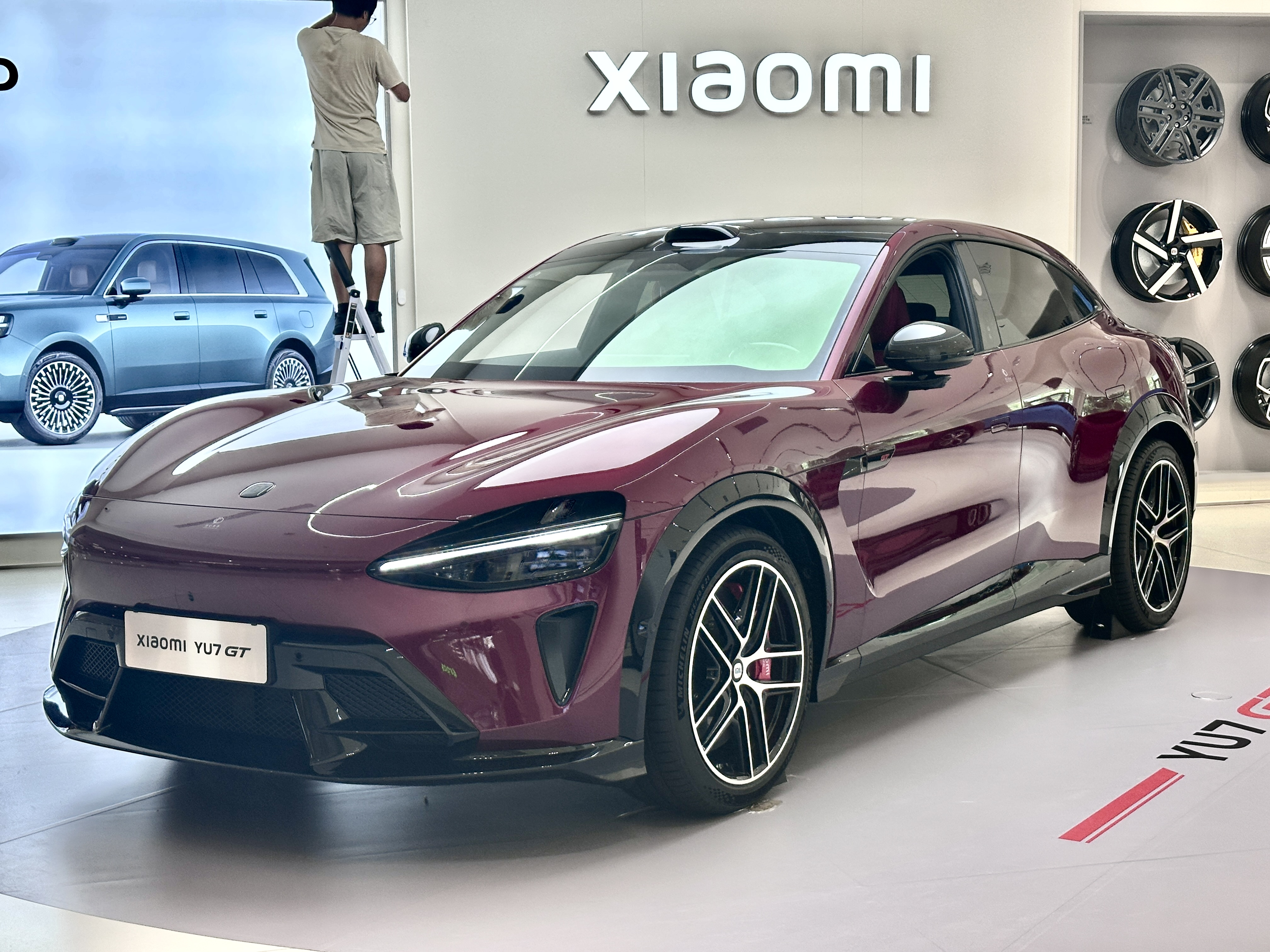
Xiaomi YU7 GT

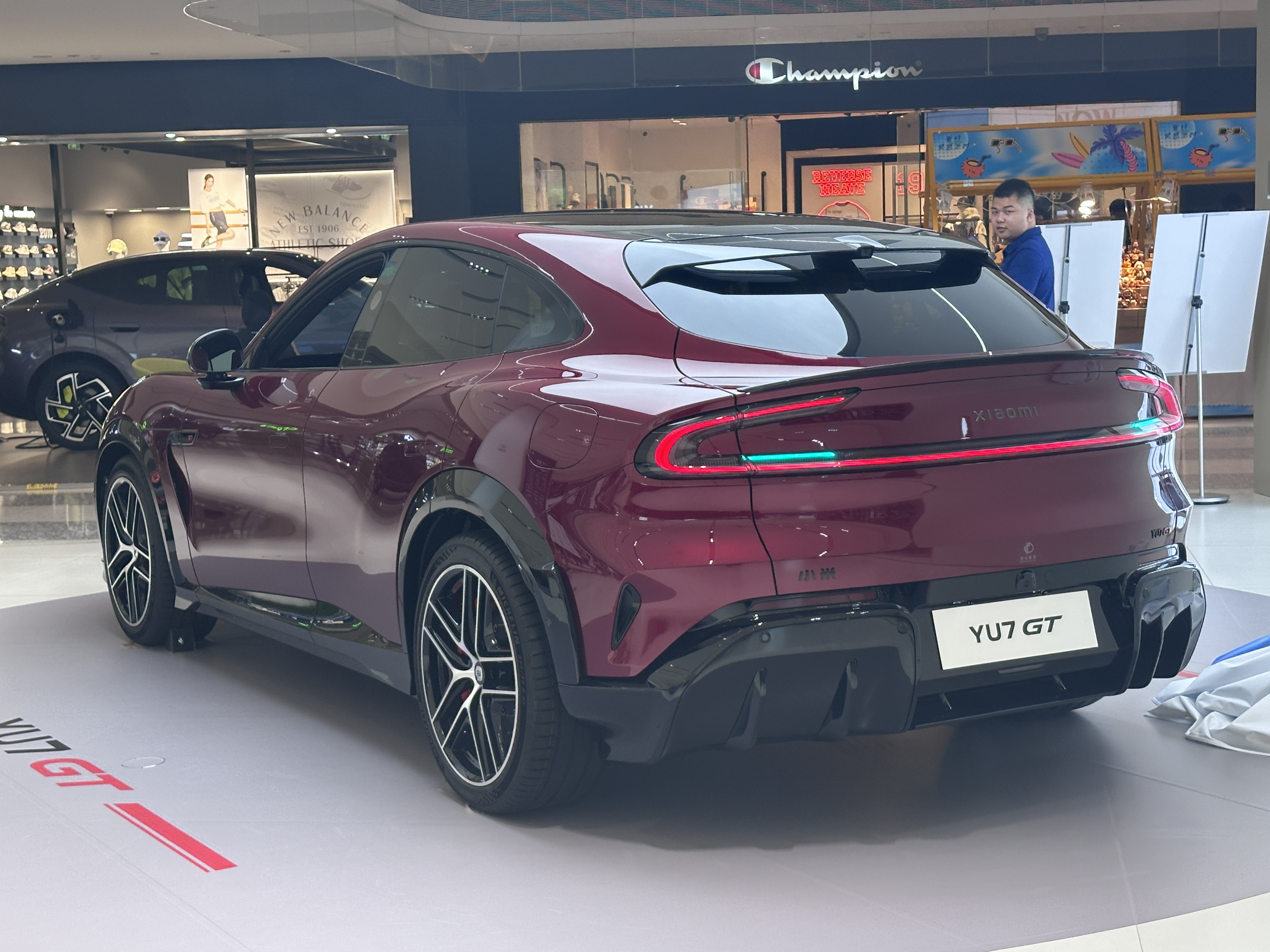
Rear view

== Powertrain ==
The YU7 is powered by a choice of either a rear-wheel drive or two dual motor all-wheel drive powertrains, all using Xiaomi's self-developed HyperEngine V6s Plus motors and a 871V SiC electrical architecture.

Compared to the original HyperEngine V6s, Xiaomi says the V6s Plus uses segmented magnetic steel rather than conventional whole sections to improve efficiency, and voltage overmodulation and upgraded power modules with improved topology optimization algorithms to increase performance. The former allows for a 4 km (2.5 mi) higher CLTC range rating, and the latter allows for a gain of 13 kW (17 hp; 18 PS), 28 N⋅m (21 lb⋅ft) of torque and a 1000 rpm higher top motor speed of 22,000 rpm. It is manufactured by United Automotive Electronic Systems (UAES), a joint venture between Bosch and SAIC-backed Zhong-Lian Automotive Electronics.

The standard YU7 has a single 235 kW (315 hp; 320 PS) rear motor, while the Pro has an additional 130 kW (174 hp; 177 PS) front induction motor for a total of 365 kW (489 hp; 496 PS). Both have power supplied by a 96.3 kWh LFP battery pack supplied by FinDreams, providing 835 km (519 mi) and 770 km (478 mi) CLTC range ratings, respectively, and can recharge from 10–80% in 21 minutes. Both have a top speed of 240 kilometres per hour (149 mph).

The more powerful Max consists of a 220 kW (295 hp; 299 PS) motor powering the front wheels and a 288 kW (386 hp; 392 PS) motor powering the rear wheels, for a total of 508 kW (681 hp; 691 PS) in a similar configuration to the Xiaomi SU7 Max. Power is fed from a 101.7 kWh CATL-supplied NMC battery pack providing up to 760 kilometres (472 mi) of CLTC range. It can accelerate from 0–100 km/h (62 mph) in 3.23 seconds (2.98 excluding rollout) and has a top speed of 253 km/h (157 mph). Xiaomi says that the YU7 Max is capable of peak 5.2C charge rates with a 10–80% charging time of 12 minutes, and can recharge 620 kilometres (385 mi) of range within 15 minutes.

Specifications
Model	Battery		Years	Power			Torque	Range (CLTC)	Kerb weight	10–80% charge time	0–100 km/h (62 mph)	Top speed
Model	Type	Weight	Years	Front	Rear	Total	Total	Range (CLTC)	Kerb weight	10–80% charge time	0–100 km/h (62 mph)	Top speed
YU7	73 kWh LFP		2026–present	—	235 kW (315 hp; 320 PS)	235 kW (315 hp; 320 PS)	528 N⋅m (389 lb⋅ft)	643 km (400 mi)	2,200 kg (4,850 lb)	20 min	5.9 sec	220 km/h (137 mph)
YU7 Long Range	96.3 kWh LFP FinDreams	719 kg (1,585 lb)	2025–present	—	235 kW (315 hp; 320 PS)	235 kW (315 hp; 320 PS)	528 N⋅m (389 lb⋅ft)	835 km (519 mi)	2,315 kg (5,104 lb)	21 min	5.88 sec	240 km/h (149 mph)
YU7 Pro	96.3 kWh LFP FinDreams	719 kg (1,585 lb)	2025–present	130 kW (174 hp; 177 PS)	235 kW (315 hp; 320 PS)	365 kW (489 hp; 496 PS)	690 N⋅m (509 lb⋅ft)	770 km (478 mi)	2,425 kg (5,346 lb)	21 min	4.27 sec	240 km/h (149 mph)
YU7 Max	101.7 kWh NMC CATL	666 kg (1,468 lb)	2025–present	220 kW (295 hp; 299 PS)	288 kW (386 hp; 392 PS)	508 kW (681 hp; 691 PS)	866 N⋅m (639 lb⋅ft)	760 km (472 mi)	2,405 kg (5,302 lb)	12 min	3.23 sec	253 km/h (157 mph)
YU7 GT	101.7 kWh NMC CATL	666 kg (1,468 lb)	2026–present	288 kW (386 hp; 392 PS)	450 kW (603 hp; 612 PS)	738 kW (990 hp; 1,003 PS)	1,068 N⋅m (788 lb⋅ft)	705 km (438 mi)	2,460 kg (5,423 lb)	12 min	2.92 sec	300 km/h (186 mph)

== Sales ==
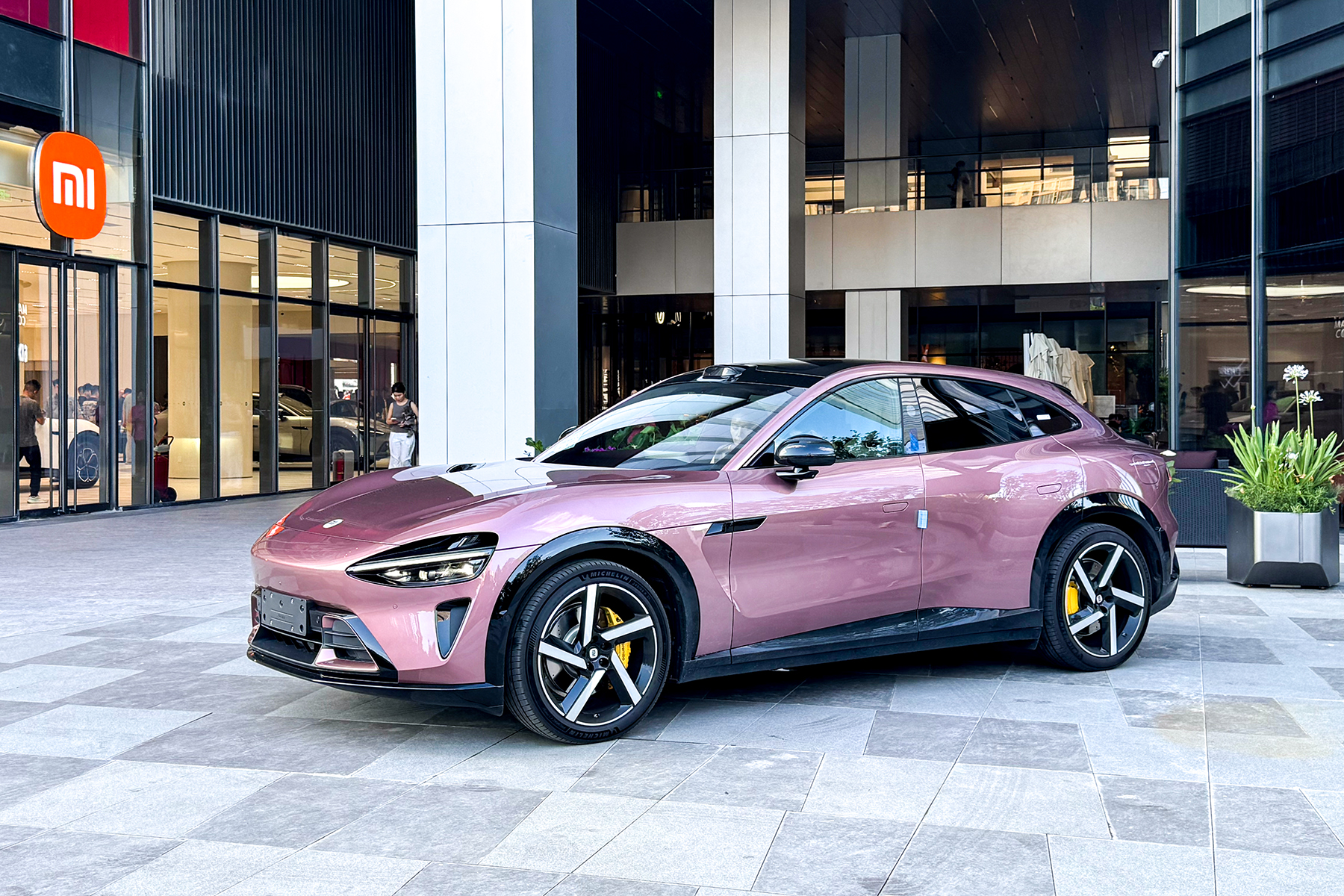
Xiaomi YU7 at a Xiaomi Store in Zhengdong

Within two minutes of the 26 June 2025 launch presentation ending at 10:00 p.m., the YU7 received 196,000 pre-order deposits and 128,000 locked-in orders, which grew to 200,000 pre-orders in three minutes and 289,000 pre-orders in one hour. After 18 hours, the YU7 had received 240,000 nonrefundable locked-in orders, with the first delivery estimate ranging up to 56 weeks.

He Xiaopeng, founder and chairman of XPeng, announced that he had placed an order for the YU7. Xiaomi chairman and CEO Lei Jun thanked him and promised him to deliver the car as soon as possible.

Sales
Year	China
2025	152,344

== Controversy ==
Huang Zhaokun, the Deputy Head of the Powertrain Development Department at Dongfeng Nissan's technology center, issued a public apology and deleted his post after sparking widespread controversy for a repost on Weibo where he questioned Xiaomi Auto's high order volume, stating that "customers will have to wait more than a year for delivery; no country has such blindly loyal brand fans".

The use of a consumer-grade Snapdragon chip in the car's interior has sparked a safety controversy. However, experts point out that a normal consumer-grade chip could never pass the ISO 26262 certification.

== See also ==
- Xiaomi SkyNomad N70
- Xiaomi SkyNomad N90
- Xiaomi SU7
- Xiaomi HyperOS
