= Xiaomi SkyNomad N70 =

Range-extended electric mid-size SUV

- The Xiaomi SkyNomad N70 in Xiangyang, China.

Overview
- Manufacturer: Xiaomi Auto
- Production: 2026–present
- Assembly: China: Beijing
- Designer: Gao Yutian

Body and chassis
- Class: Mid-size SUV
- Body style: 5-door SUV
- Layout: Front-engine, front-motor, front-wheel-drive (N70 Pro); Front-engine, dual-motor, all-wheel-drive (N70 Max)
- Platform: Xiaomi Kunlun Architecture
- Related: Xiaomi SkyNomad N90

Powertrain
- Engine: Petrol range extender: 1.5 L turbocharged I4
- Hybrid drivetrain: EREV (series hybrid)
- Battery: 70 kWh
- Range: 1,500 km (932 mi) (claimed)
- Electric range: 400–500 km (249–311 mi) (claimed, CLTC)

Dimensions
- Wheelbase: 2,950 mm (116.1 in)
- Length: 4,960 mm (195.3 in)
- Width: 1,998 mm (78.7 in)
- Height: 1,785 mm (70.3 in)
- Curb weight: 2,453–2,505 kg (5,408–5,523 lb) (N70); 2,561–2,610 kg (5,646–5,754 lb) (N70 Max)

The Xiaomi SkyNomad N70 (Chinese: 小米澎程N70; pinyin: Xiǎomǐ Péngchéng N70) is a range-extended electric mid-size SUV manufactured by Xiaomi Auto.

Alongside the flagship N90, the SkyNomad N70 is the second vehicle in Xiaomi SkyNomad series. It was first revealed through MIIT documents on 10 July 2026.

== Overview ==
The SkyNomad N70 adopts a similar design to the N90, including "Mi"-shaped headlights also seen in the SU7 and YU7, a continuous panel in between with the "SkyNomad" wordmark, and a wraparound taillight design. It was introduced on 30 July 2026, with the N90.

On 24 August 2026, Xiaomi officially announced that the SkyNomad N70 and N90 would launch in early September alongside the Xiaomi 18 Fold, which is powered by Xiaomi's in-house XRING O3 chip.

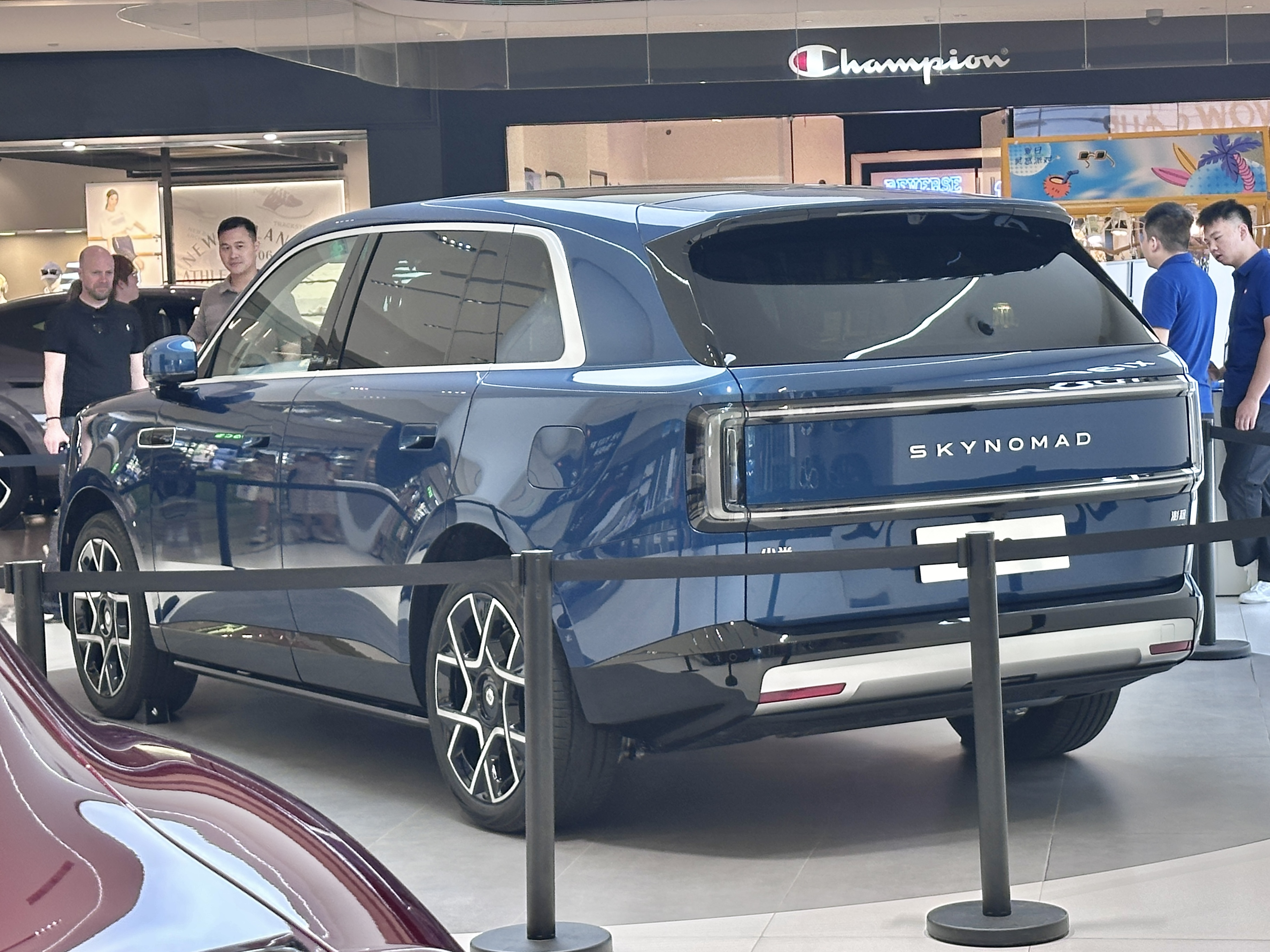
Rear view

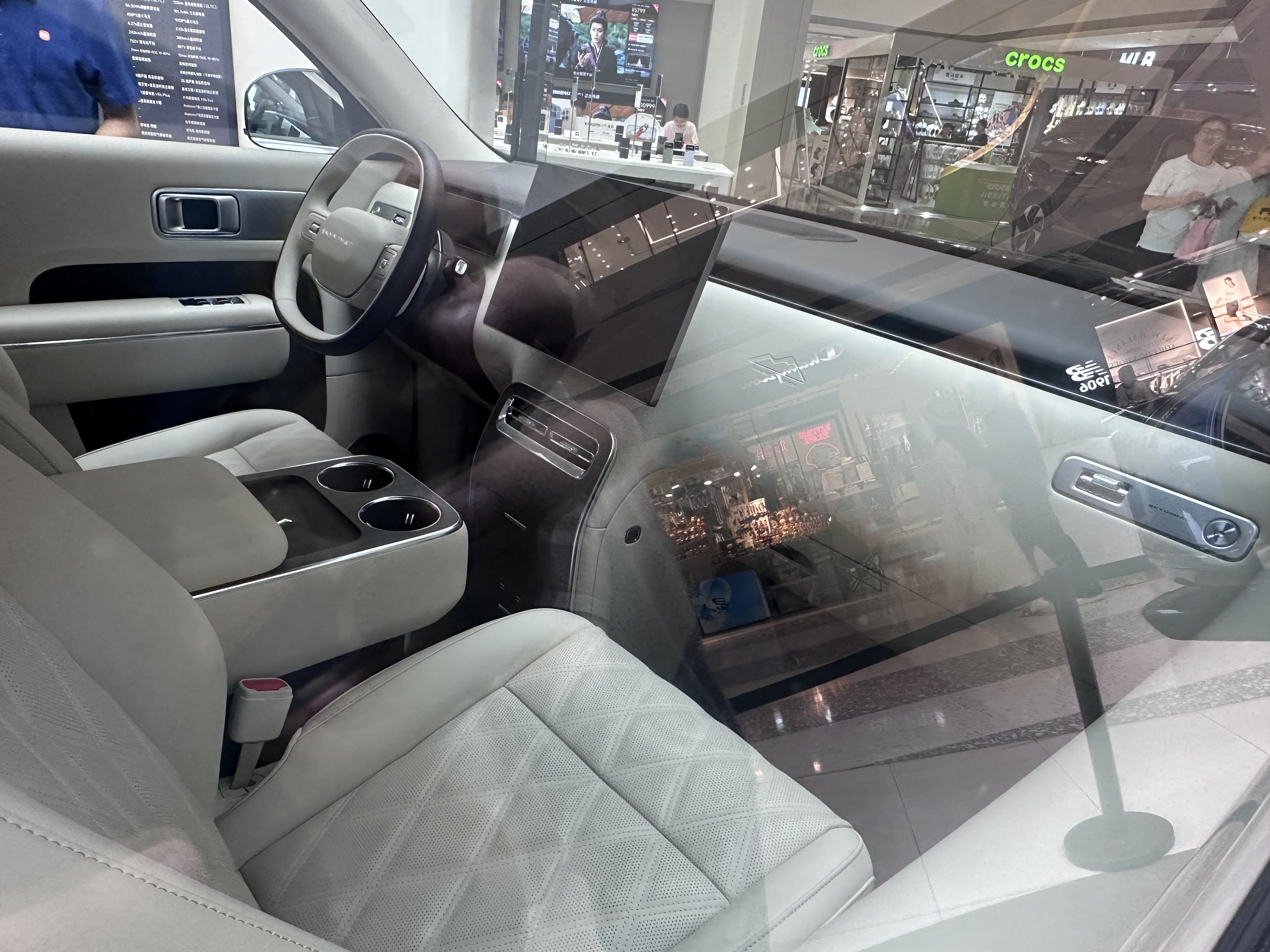
Interior
