= Xiaomi SkyNomad N90 =

Range-extended full-size SUV

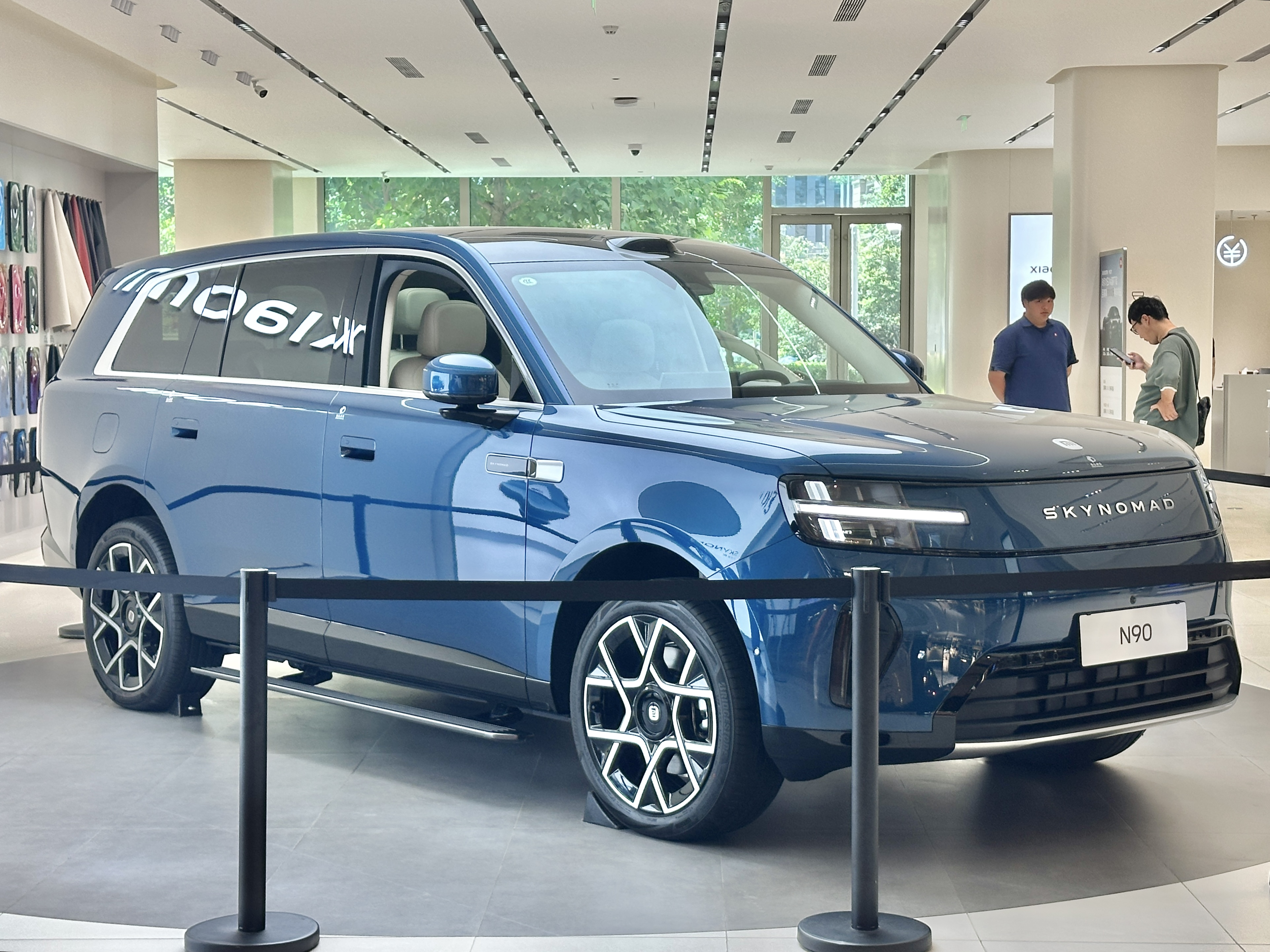

Overview
- Manufacturer: Xiaomi Auto
- Production: 2026–present
- Assembly: China: Beijing
- Designer: Gao Yutian

Body and chassis
- Class: Full-size SUV
- Body style: 5-door SUV
- Layout: Front-engine, dual-motor, all-wheel-drive
- Platform: Xiaomi Kunlun Architecture
- Related: Xiaomi SkyNomad N70

Powertrain
- Engine: Petrol range extender: 1.5 L Dong'an M15DRE turbo I4
- Hybrid drivetrain: Series hybrid
- Battery: 52 kWh LFP Sunwoda; 76 kWh NMC CALB
- Range: 1,705 km (1,059 mi) (CLTC)
- Electric range: 270–380 km (168–236 mi) (WLTP); 464–505 km (288–314 mi) (CLTC)

Dimensions
- Wheelbase: 3,080 mm (121.3 in)
- Length: 5,285 mm (208.1 in)
- Width: 1,998 mm (78.7 in)
- Height: 1,825 mm (71.9 in)
- Curb weight: 2,800–2,840 kg (6,173–6,261 lb)

The Xiaomi SkyNomad N90 (Chinese: 小米澎程N90; pinyin: Xiǎomǐ Péngchéng N90) is a range-extended full-size SUV manufactured by Xiaomi Auto.

It is the first model under the SkyNomad (小米澎程; Xiǎomǐ Péngchéng) product line and the first Xiaomi Auto vehicle to use a range-extended powertrain.

== Overview ==
The SkyNomad is Xiaomi Auto's second product series, positioned around the concept of "intelligent, reconfigurable, large-space SUVs", distinct from the core Xiaomi Auto SU-series and YU-series models. The vehicle was developed under the internal project name Kunlun, which shares its name with the Kunlun Architecture platform on which it is built.

The SkyNomad N90 was officially named on 10 July 2026 alongside the release of the first official images. The English brand name "SkyNomad" is rendered in Chinese as Péngchéng (澎程) and appears as a wordmark on the front fascia of the production vehicle.

On 24 August 2026, Xiaomi officially announced that the SkyNomad N90 and N70 would launch in early September alongside the Xiaomi 18 Fold, which is powered by Xiaomi's in-house XRING O3 chip.

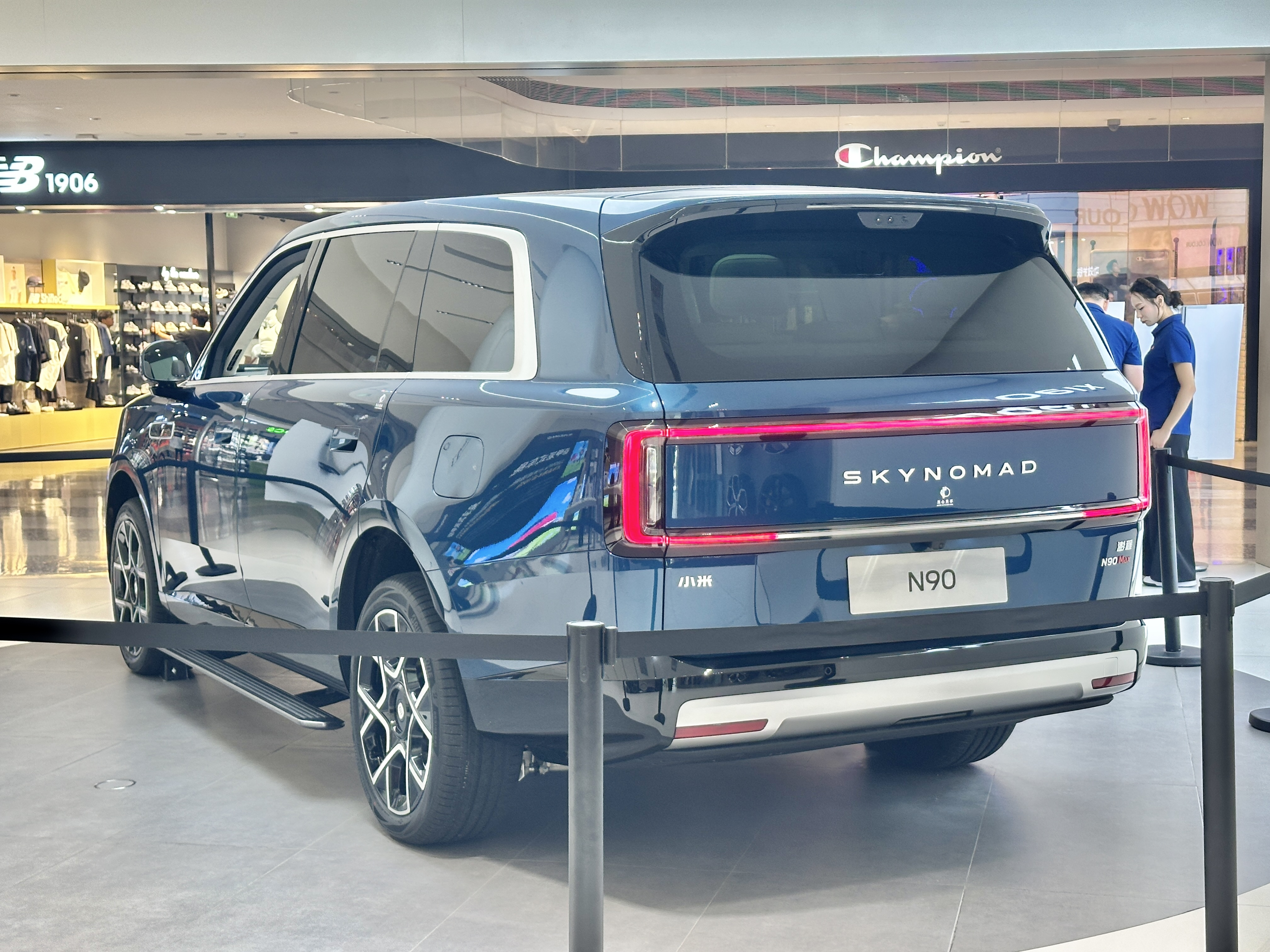
Rear view

Interior

== Design ==
=== Exterior ===
The N90 adopts a design language consistent with Xiaomi Auto's existing SU7 and YU7 models. The front end features Xiaomi's signature "Mi"-shaped LED light signature integrated with the front grille, forming a continuous panel bearing the "SkyNomad" wordmark. The front apron incorporates triangular ventilation openings on each side flanking a large trapezoidal central air intake. A lidar unit is mounted on the roof, and sensing hardware is integrated into the front fenders. The prominent front and rear fender flares create a wide-body visual stance. Door handles use a semi-concealed design with a mechanical structure compliant with China's updated vehicle safety regulations, and exterior mirrors use the same floating-mount design as the SU7 and YU7. The rear features a distinctive circular tail-light design. An optional high-roof variant with an integrated rooftop tent structure known as Studio Edition has been referenced, further reinforcing the model's "free large-space" positioning. It has a drag coefficient of 0.255C_{d}.

The vehicle has an array of six microphones and a pair of speakers on the exterior to accept voice commands from outside the car.

The Xiaomi SkyNomad N90 Studio Edition with the High-roof design.

The Xiaomi SkyNomad N90 Studio Edition showcasing the built-in roof tent.

=== Interior ===
The vehicle is offered in five-seat and seven-seat configurations, with the former being marketed as SkyNomad N70. The interior features a completely flat floor and a longitudinal rail system running the full length of the cabin. The two front seats are capable of 180-degree rotation, and front and second-row seats support a 'zero-gravity' recline mode with extending legrests. The all seats and the center console are mounted to the floor rails and are motorized to allow for several different flexible configurations, such as sacrificing the third row and cargo space to provide the second row with up to 1.55 m (61 in) of legroom, or compressing the second and third row forwards to allow for up to 1,831 L (64.7 cu ft) of rear cargo space in the N90 compared to the standard 577 L (20.4 cu ft), or up to 2,425 L (85.6 cu ft) in the N70. Additional configurations include a face-to-face mode, an office mode, a nap mode, and a bed mode. Multiple table configurations are supported: a table can be mounted to the rail with an adjustable surface angle, or to a rearward-sliding central island console. The N90's second row has 1,233 mm (48.5 in) of cabin height and 950 mm (37 in) wide seating space with a 180 mm (7.1 in) aisle in between; the third row has 962 mm (37.9 in) of headroom and 890 mm (35 in) of seating space for its 3-passenger bench seat. The first and second row seats have heating, ventilation, and massaging functions as standard.

The dashboard contains an 8.8-inch digital instrument cluster and a 16.1-inch 3K-resolution central infotainment touchscreen. The rear seats have access to a 6.7-inch control screen, 2 cupholders in the center console, a 9 L (0.32 cu ft) refrigerator compartment, and a 21.4-inch 3K-resolution ceiling-mounted entertainment display. Third-row occupants can optionally install a tablet on the rear face of the front-row seatbacks. An air conditioning vent is integrated into the B-pillar. It is equipped with a 25-speaker 4890-watt 7.1.4 surround sound system, including speakers built into each headrest to respond to individual voice commands.

=== Chassis ===
It has a turning radius of 5.95 m (19.5 ft). Xiaomi says 90.4% of the chassis consists of high-strength steel or aluminium alloy, with 16 locations reinforced with Xiaomi's proprietary 2200 MPa high-strength steel alloy. Additionally, the vehicle uses two very large castings which combines the A, B, C, and D pillars and door rings into a single piece which measures 3.3 m (130 in) long and 1.5 m (59 in) tall, which Xiaomi claims increases side impact strength by 19%. It uses a double wishbone front suspension and a multilink independent rear suspension geometry, with a dual-chamber air suspension system and continuous damping control. It is equipped with 255 mm and 265 mm tire widths at the front and rear, respectively.

The vehicle has a completely flat floor from front to rear which is sloped forward by about 3 degrees. This was achieved by reducing underfloor thickness to 298 mm (11.7 in), which Xiaomi says was achieved by reducing the battery pack thickness by 180 mm (7.1 in) and optimizing the rear drive motor layout by moving the integrated control electronics module forward, shortening the unit by 145 mm (5.7 in). Xiaomi reduced the intrusion of the rear wheel wells into the cabin by utilizing a compact H-arm rear suspension geometry and optimizing the rear air vent ducts, allowing for 4.4 m^{2} (47 sq ft) of usable floor space and a 3-seat third row. The rear doors can up to 90 degrees and the rear cargo area lift height is 690 mm (27 in).

The Xiaomi says the vehicle is capable of wading through 750 mm (30 in) of water through waterproofing several components, including dual door seals and an IPX9K rating for the traction battery, and raising the engine air intakes to 1,109 mm (43.7 in) and cabin air outlet to 950 mm (37 in). The vehicle is also capable of floating in water in emergency situations, similar to the Yangwang U8.

=== Technology ===
The vehicle is equipped with Xiaomi's HAD driver ADAS system with Xiaomi's XLA cognitive model. Max variants have a sensor suite consisting of one 128-line Hesai AT128 roof-mounted LiDAR, one Robosense solid-state rear-facing LiDAR, five mmWave radars, 11 cameras, and 12 ultrasonic sensors feeding into an Nvidia Thor-U SoC providing 700TOPS of computing power. The cockpit is powered by a Qualcomm Snapdragon 8 Gen 3 processor and supports Xiaomi's proprietary AI voice assistant. Both chips are packaged in the same 4-in-one module as found in the Xiaomi YU7.

== Powertrain ==
The SkyNomad N90 is range-extended electric vehicle, which uses a plug-in series hybrid system. It uses a 1.5-liter turbocharged inline-4 supplied by Dong'an and customized by Xiaomi which outputs 150 hp
(112 kW; 152 PS). It has a peak thermal efficiency of 42%, which Xiaomi says was increased by 1.5% by their customizations and results in a fuel consumption improvement of 0.2 L/100 km resulting in 6.26 L/100 km (37.6 mpg_{‑US}) on the WLTP cycle and a total range of 1,705 km (1,059 mi) on the CLTC cycle. Additionally, Xiaomi says that the engine oil change interval can be extended to 3 years or 30,000 km (19,000 mi) depending on engine usage.

The N90 comes exclusively with a dual-motor all-wheel drive powertrain consisting of a 210 kW permanent magnet synchronous front motor paired with a 100 kW AC induction rear motor for a total of 416 hp (310 kW; 422 PS). The N70 is also available with a single-motor configuration without the induction motor for 281 hp (210 kW; 285 PS). Xiaomi says the permanent magnet motor has a peak efficiency of 95.77%, which was achieved by using silicon carbide power electronics, 0.2 mm-thick silicon steel rotor laminations, and epoxy-coated segmented magnets to increase efficiency by 2.65%.

The N90 is available exclusively with a CALB-supplied 76 kWh NMC battery pack, which provides a WLTP electric range rating of up to 464 km (288 mi). It can charge from 20–80% in 18 minutes, and can replenish 285 km (177 mi) of range within 15 minutes. The N70 is available with the same battery pack, but the standard battery is a Farasis-supplied 52 kWh LFP pack providing up to 270 km (168 mi) of WLTP electric range.

The N90 is capable of up to 6.6 kW of V2L output at 220 V.

Model	Battery		Power	Electric range		Range	0–100 km/h (62 mph)	Kerb weight
Model	Type	Weight	Power	WLTP	CLTC	CLTC	0–100 km/h (62 mph)	Kerb weight
N70	52 kWh LFP Farasis	380 kg (838 lb)	281 hp (210 kW; 285 PS)	265–270 km (165–168 mi)				2,453–2,505 km (1,524–1,557 mi)
N70	76 kWh NMC CALB	400 kg (882 lb)	416 hp (310 kW; 422 PS)	375–380 km (233–236 mi)	505 km (314 mi)	1,461 km (908 mi)	5.5 sec	2,561–2,610 km (1,591–1,622 mi)
N90	76 kWh NMC CALB	400 kg (882 lb)	416 hp (310 kW; 422 PS)	363–370 km (226–230 mi)	464 km (288 mi)	1,705 km (1,059 mi)	5.9 sec	2,800–2,840 km (1,740–1,765 mi)
