= Xiaomi Auto =

Chinese electric vehicle manufacturer by Xiaomi

Xiaomi Automobile Co Ltd
- Native name: 小米汽车有限公司
- Type: Subsidiary
- Industry: Automotive
- Founded: September 2021; 5 years ago
- Headquarters: Beijing, China
- Area served: China; UAE; Europe
- Key people: Lei Jun
- Products: Electric vehicles
- Production output: ▲411,082 vehicles (2025)
- Revenue: ▲CN¥106.1 billion US$15.35 billion (2025)
- Owner: Xiaomi
- Website: www.xiaomiauto.com

Xiaomi Auto (小米汽车; legally Xiaomi Automobile Co Ltd) is a Chinese electric vehicle manufacturer headquartered in Beijing. As of 2025, Xiaomi Auto has a market capitalisation of approximately US$135.2 billion. It is a subsidiary of Chinese consumer electronics company Xiaomi. Founded in 2021 by Xiaomi founder and chairman Lei Jun, the company mainly develops and manufactures electric vehicles.

== History ==
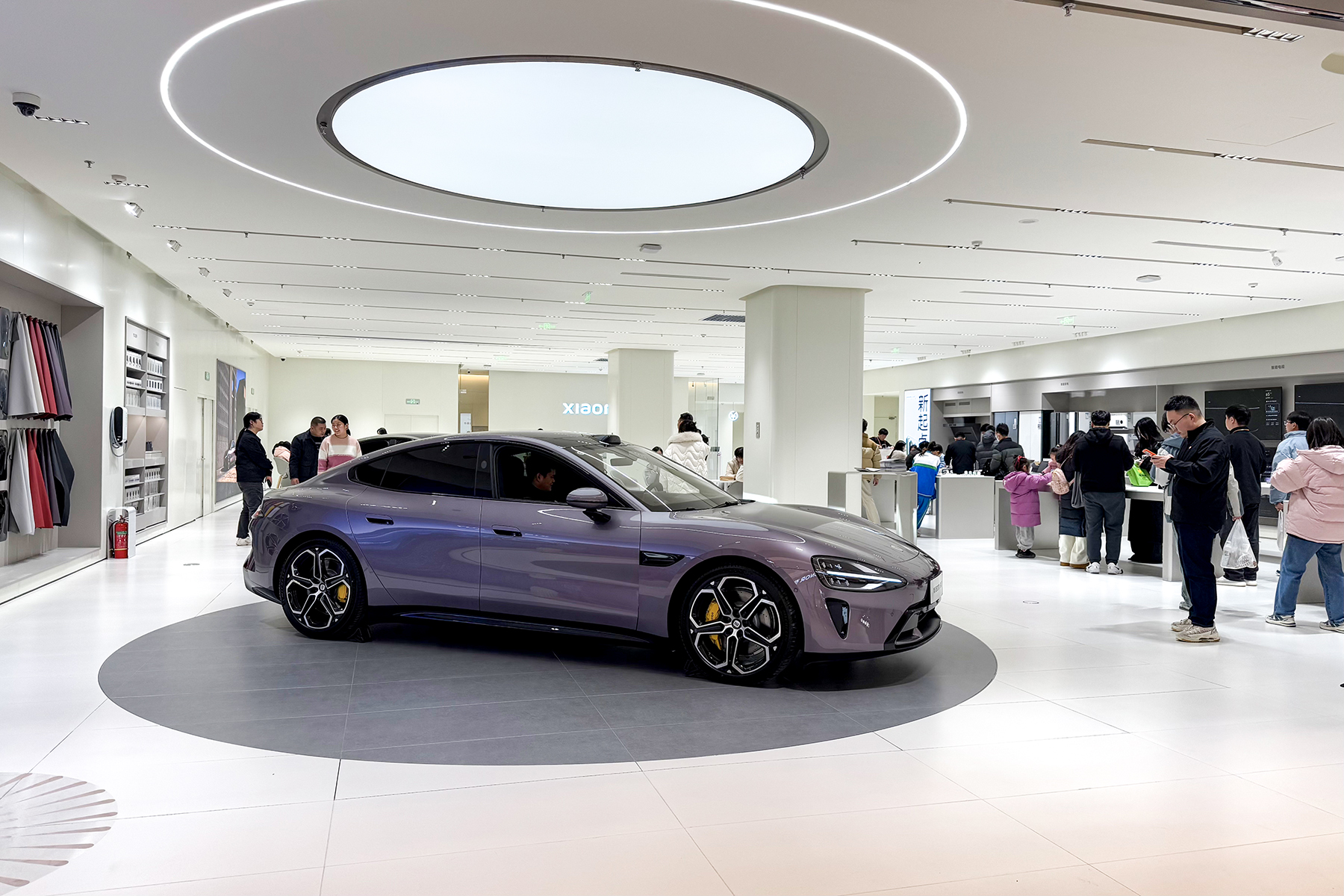
A Xiaomi SU7 on display at a Xiaomi Store

In January 2021, Lei Jun received a call informing him that Xiaomi had been sanctioned by the United States. During an emergency meeting with the board of directors, someone raised the question of what would happen to Xiaomi's 30,000 or 40,000 employees if the company's mobile phone business could no longer continue. This led to Xiaomi's plan to diversify into car manufacturing. Lei Jun then received strong recommendations from his friends, such as Nio CEO William Li and XPeng CEO He Xiaopeng to enter the automotive industry. He acknowledged that the transition into smart electric vehicles was an inevitable trend.

On March 30, 2021, Xiaomi announced that would establish a wholly owned subsidiary dedicated to the intelligent electric vehicle (EV) business. The initial investment for this venture was set at 10 billion Chinese yuan, with an expected total investment of 10 billion US dollars over the next 10 years. Lei Jun would also serve as the CEO of the intelligent electric vehicle business. On September 1, 2021, Xiaomi Automobile Co., Ltd. was officially established. Following the announcement, Xiaomi Auto attracted a wide range of talent, including Liu Anyu, an early Xiaomi entrepreneur, Li Tianyuan, a European-based Chinese car designer that built his career in BMW, and Hu Zhengnan, a partner at Shunwei Capital. Xiaomi Auto's recruitment efforts were met with an overwhelming response, receiving approximately 380,000 job applications.

On November 27, 2021, the Municipal Government of Beijing and Xiaomi officially signed a cooperation agreement, formally announcing Xiaomi Automobile's establishment in the Beijing Economic and Technological Development Zone. Xiaomi Automobile plans to build a two-phase vehicle factory with a cumulative annual production capacity of 300,000 vehicles. The production capacities for the first and second phases are 150,000 vehicles each. The first car is scheduled to roll off the production line in the Beijing Economic and Technological Development Zone in 2024, marking the commencement of mass production.

On 28 December 2023, Xiaomi has unveiled its first electric car, the SU7. It was formally launched on 28 March 2024 in Beijing, with Xiaomi starting to take orders for the car on that day.

In July 2024, Xiaomi Auto gained an independent car-making qualification from the Chinese government after previously using BAIC Group's credentials. In the same month, Xiaomi Group spent 840 million to purchase Beijing Yizhuang New Town to build a car manufacturing plant. On 22 May 2025 during a 15th anniversary event, Xiaomi revealed details of its second vehicle, the YU7 SUV, which is expected to launch later that year in July. The reveal was originally scheduled to be at Auto Shanghai in late-April, but was delayed due controversies surrounding the fatal crash of a Xiaomi SU7 carrying three college students in assisted driving mode on 29 March.

In November 2026, Xiaomi Auto launched its first officially authorized overseas presales in the United Arab Emirates through local distributor Gargash Prime Automotive, the luxury automotive division of the Gargash Group. The initial UAE lineup comprised 13 variants across three models—the SU7 battery-electric sedan, the YU7 battery-electric SUV, and the SkyNomad extended-range SUV—with first deliveries scheduled for December 2026 and remaining trims slated for February 2027. The distributor-led rollout followed memorandums of understanding signed with eight German dealer groups in September 2026 and preceded Xiaomi CEO Lei Jun's announcement at the APEC CEO Summit that the company would formally enter wider international markets in 2027.

== Products ==
=== Xiaomi series ===
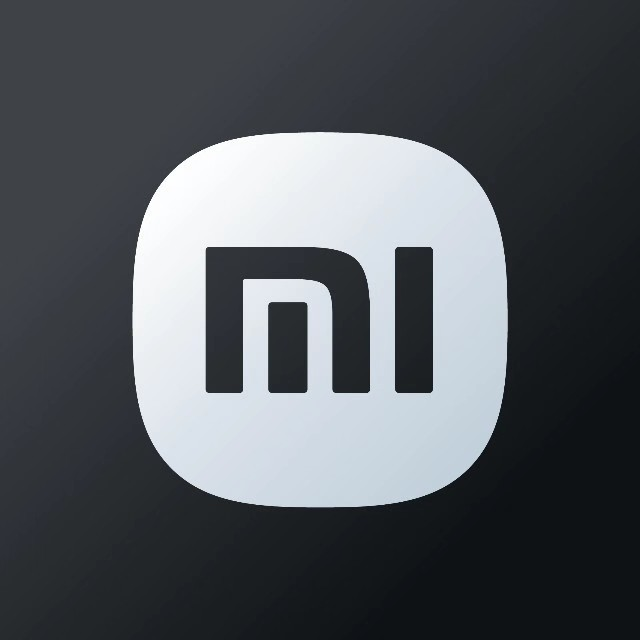
Logo color variant, used in Xiaomi vehicles

- Xiaomi YU7 (2025–present), mid-size coupe SUV, BEV
- Xiaomi SU7 (2024–present), full-size sedan, BEV
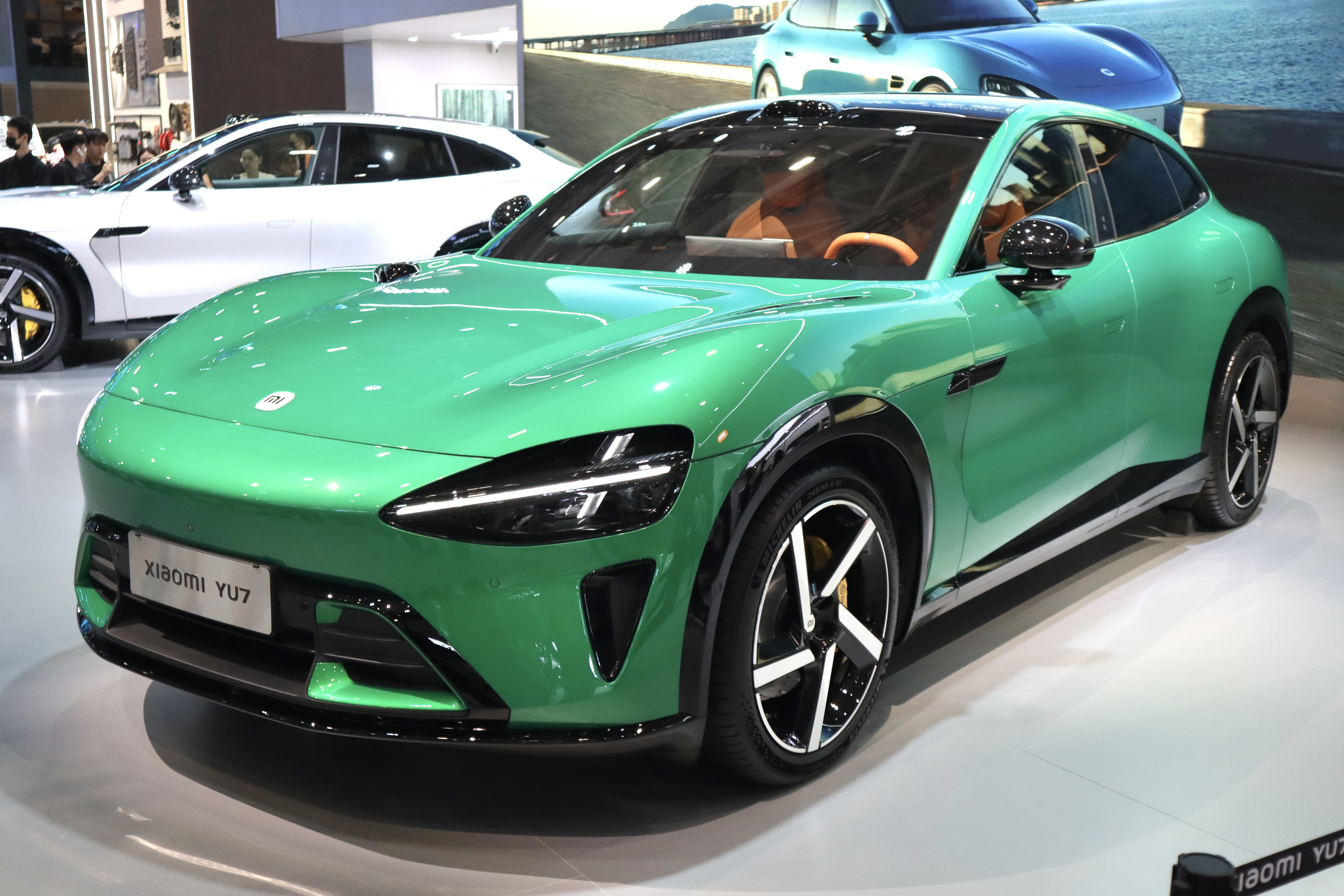
Xiaomi YU7

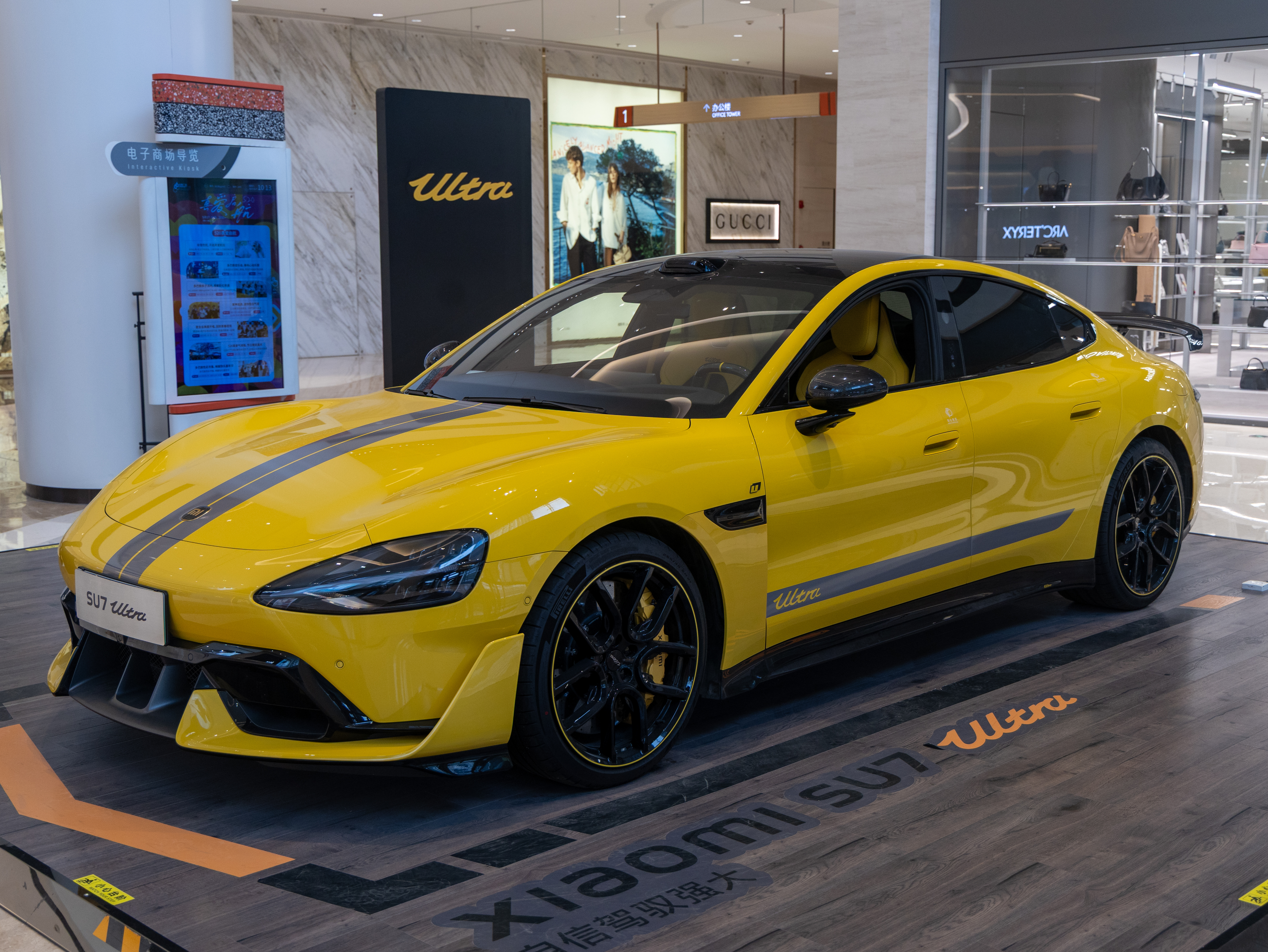
Xiaomi SU7 Ultra

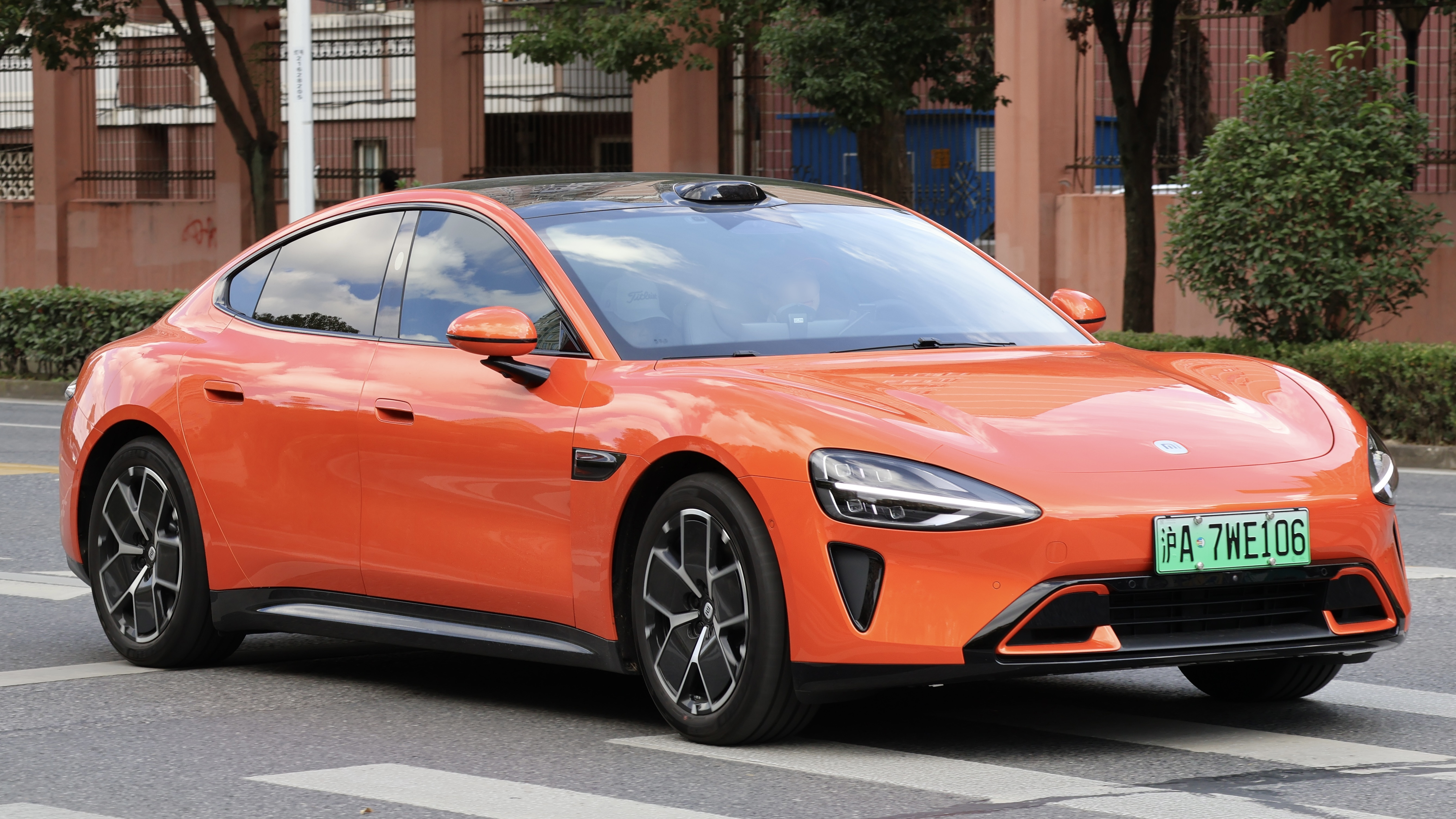
Xiaomi SU7

=== SkyNomad series ===
- Xiaomi SkyNomad N70, (2026–present) mid-size SUV, EREV
- Xiaomi SkyNomad N90 Max Studio, (2026–present), full-size SUV, EREV, flagship
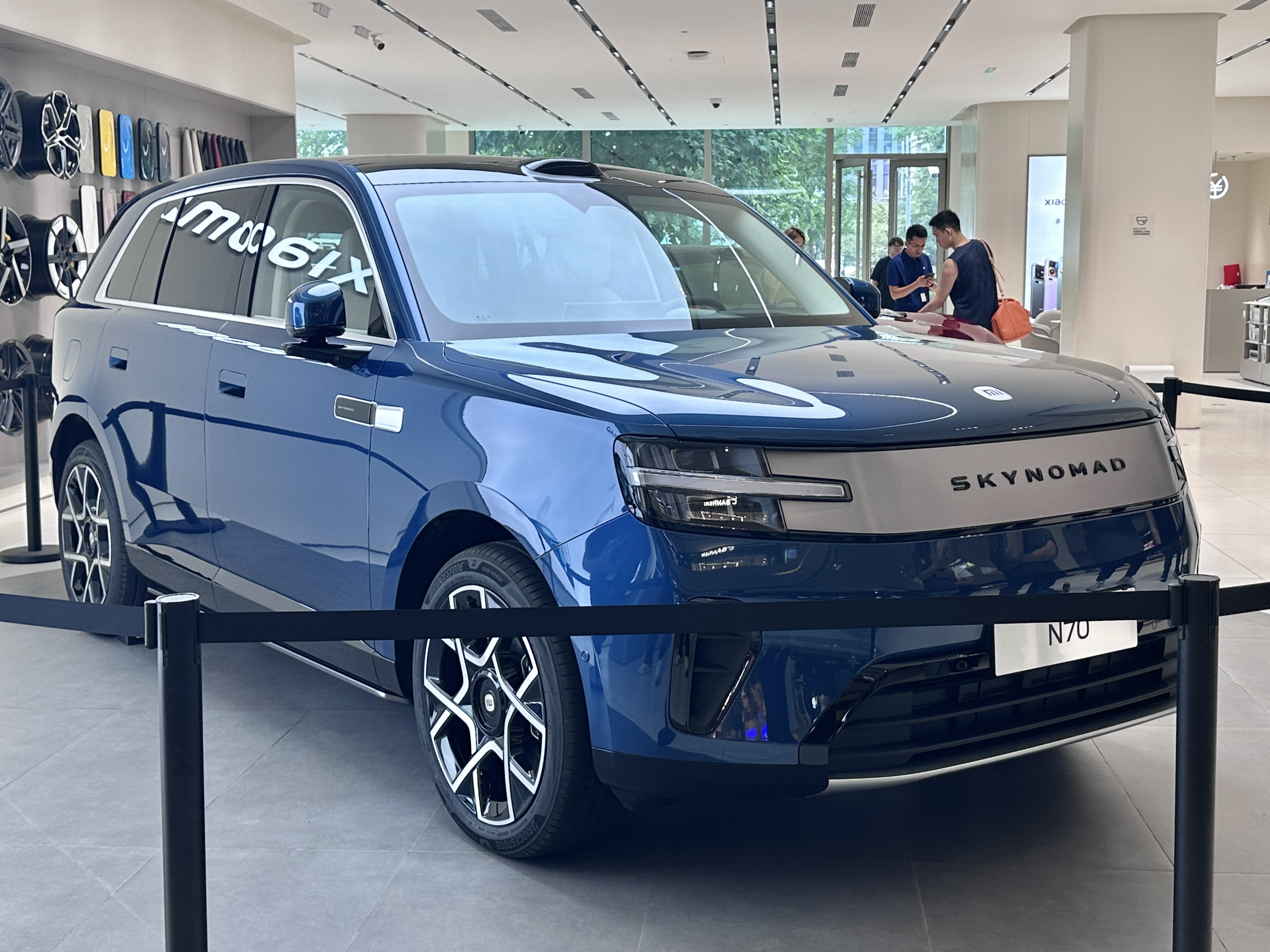
Xiaomi SkyNomad N70

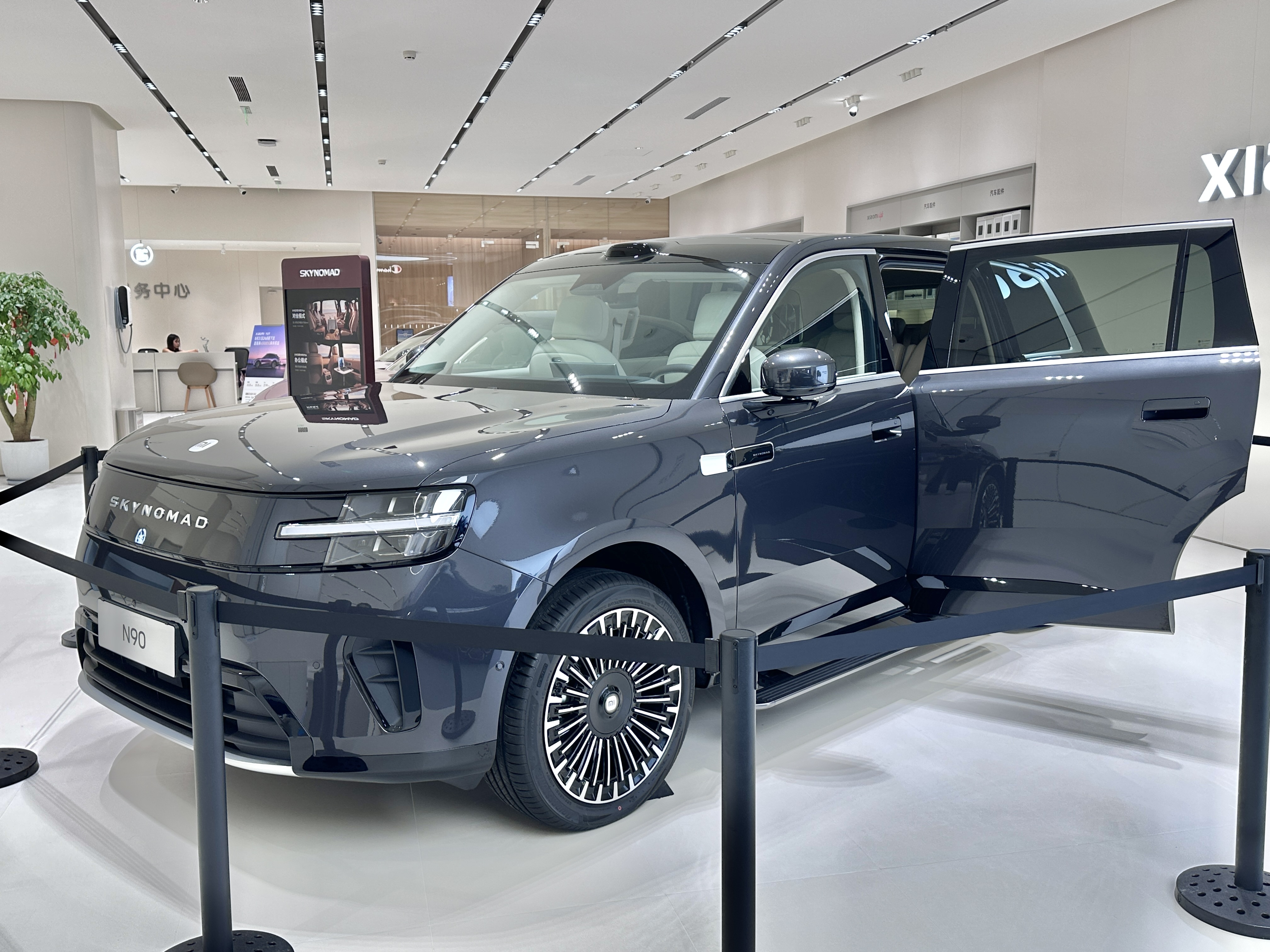
Xiaomi SkyNomad N90 Max

=== Concept ===
- Xiaomi Vision Gran Turismo concept
Xiaomi Vision Gran Turismo concept

== Sales ==
Sales of Xiaomi Auto in China
Year	SU7	YU7	Total	Reference
2024	139,487	—N/a	139,487	
2025	258,164	153,673	411,837	

== See also ==
- Xiaomi
- List of Xiaomi products
- Automobile manufacturers and brands of China
- List of automobile manufacturers of China
- Harmony Intelligent Mobility Alliance
