= Xiaomi Semiconductor =

Chinese line of semiconductors

Xiaomi Surge / Xring
- Type: In-house semiconductor line
- Industry: Semiconductors
- Founded: 2014 (as Pinecone Electronics)
- Founder: Xiaomi Corporation / Leadcore Technology
- Products: System-on-chips, ISPs, charging management chips, battery management chips, modem/connectivity chips, AI accelerators, automotive chips
- Parent: Xiaomi Corporation

Xiaomi's in-house semiconductors are a line of system-on-chips (SoCs) and specialized silicon developed by Xiaomi Corporation, initially under the brand name Surge (澎湃, Péngpài) and, since 2025, under the brand name Xring (玄戒, Xuánjiè). Development has been carried out through Xiaomi's chip subsidiary Pinecone Electronics (松果电子), founded in 2014, and later through Xiaomi's broader semiconductor division following a 2019 corporate restructuring.

Xiaomi is one of a small number of smartphone brands — alongside Apple, Samsung, and Huawei — to have designed and shipped its own flagship-class mobile processor.

== History ==
=== Origins: Pinecone Electronics (2014) ===
In 2014, Xiaomi and Leadcore Technology (a subsidiary of Datang Telecom) jointly founded Pinecone Electronics to develop a fully in-house smartphone processor, following the precedent set by Apple, Samsung, and Huawei's HiSilicon.

=== First generation: Surge S1 (2017) ===
Xiaomi's first self-developed SoC, the Surge S1, was unveiled in February 2017 and shipped in the mid-range Xiaomi Mi 5C. Engineering samples were produced in late 2015, with mass production beginning at the end of 2016.

Specifications:

- 64-bit octa-core CPU: 4× Cortex-A53 up to 2.2 GHz + 4× Cortex-A53 at 1.4 GHz (big.LITTLE)
- GPU: Mali-T860 MP4
- Process: TSMC 28 nm HPC+
- Used only in one commercial device, the Mi 5C

=== Surge S2 (announced, never released) ===
A follow-up flagship chip, the Surge S2, was reported from 2017 onward. It was said to pair four Cortex-A73 cores (up to 2.2 GHz) with four Cortex-A53 cores (up to 1.8 GHz), a Mali-G71 MP8 GPU, and a TSMC 16 nm FinFET process, targeting performance parity with HiSilicon's Kirin 960. The chip was repeatedly delayed — expected at MWC 2018, then alongside the Mi 6X, then the Mi 8 — and reportedly suffered multiple tape-out failures. Around 2019–2020, industry reporting indicated that flagship SoC development had been shelved due to technical bottlenecks, cost pressure, and the rising complexity of integrating 5G modems. The Surge S2 was never commercially released.

=== Pivot to specialized "component" chips (2019–2022) ===
After the S2 setback, part of the Pinecone team was spun out in 2019 to form Nanjing Big Fish Semiconductor, focused on AI/IoT chips, while the remaining team shifted strategy from full flagship SoCs to smaller, specialized chips. Under the continuing Surge brand, this produced:

- Surge C1 (2021) — Xiaomi's first self-developed image signal processor (ISP), built on a 28 nm process, handling autofocus, auto-exposure, and white-balance control via a dual-filter architecture. Debuted in the foldable Xiaomi Mi MIX Fold.
- Surge P1 (December 2021) — a fast-charging management chip enabling 120 W single-cell wired charging (96.8% efficiency) and 50 W wireless charging (97.5% efficiency), reducing heat generation by roughly 30% versus conventional multi-pump designs. Debuted in the Xiaomi 12 Pro. Its "self-developed" status was publicly disputed in 2022 amid claims the die closely resembled a chip from analog IC maker Southchip.
- Surge P2 — a subsequent iteration of the charging-management chip line.
- Surge G1 (July 2022) — a battery-management chip that, paired with the Surge P1, formed the "Surge Battery Management System," performing millisecond-level real-time monitoring of battery cell health and improving battery-life prediction accuracy. Debuted in the Xiaomi 12S Ultra.
- Surge T1 — a communications/connectivity chip mentioned in industry coverage of Xiaomi's chip roadmap.

=== Return to flagship silicon: "RING" project (2024) ===
By mid-2024, reports citing internal sources described a new, high-end Xiaomi SoC under the internal codename RING, said to target performance rivaling Qualcomm's Snapdragon 8 Gen 2-class chips. This project became the basis of the new Xring chip brand.

=== Xring era (2025–present) ===
Xring O1 (announced 22 May 2025) is Xiaomi's first true flagship-class, fully self-developed SoC since the Surge S1, following a reported four-year, roughly ¥13.5 billion (~US$1.87 billion) development effort. It debuted in the Xiaomi 15S Pro and the Xiaomi Pad 7 Ultra (China-market launch).

Specifications:

- Process: TSMC N3E (2nd-generation 3 nm), 17 metal interconnect layers
- CPU: 10 cores — 2× Cortex-X925 @ 3.9 GHz, 4× Cortex-A725 @ 3.4 GHz, 2× Cortex-A725 @ 1.9 GHz, 2× Cortex-A520 @ 1.8 GHz; ~10.5–11 MB L2 cache; ARMv9.2-A
- GPU: Immortalis-G925 MC16 (16 cores) @ ~1.39 GHz
- Die size: approximately 109 mm²
- Memory: up to 16 GB, ~85.3 GB/s bandwidth
- Connectivity: discrete 5G modem, Wi-Fi 7 (802.11be), USB 3.2 Gen 2
- Benchmarks: roughly 3,000,000+ AnTuTu v10; independent testing found CPU performance and efficiency matching or exceeding MediaTek's Dimensity 9400, close to but slightly behind Qualcomm's Snapdragon 8 Elite, with a comparatively weaker GPU score.
- Reported sales of approximately 150,000 Xring O1-based phones as of mid-2025, reflecting limited-volume use as a testbed chip.

Alongside the O1, Xiaomi introduced the lower-tier Xring T1, a modem/connectivity chip used in wearable devices, seen as a step toward integrating Xiaomi's own modem into future flagship SoCs.

Xring O2 was widely reported and rumored throughout late 2025 and into 2026 as the planned second-generation flagship chip, expected on a TSMC N3P process and originally projected to expand into tablets and eventually cars and PCs, with leaks pointing to a launch window between Q2 and September 2026. Xiaomi ultimately skipped the "O2" designation for its numbered flagship line.

Xring O3 was unveiled on 24 August 2026 as the direct successor to the Xring O1, debuting in the Xiaomi 18 Fold; reporting suggests Xiaomi skipped the "O2" name because the new chip represented a larger-than-incremental leap.

Specifications / claims:

- Process: TSMC N3P (also used for MediaTek's Dimensity 9500 and Qualcomm's Snapdragon 8 Elite Gen 5), rather than newer 2 nm nodes used in rival next-generation chips
- CPU: built around ARM's newer "C1" series cores (also used in the Dimensity 9500 and Samsung's Exynos 2600)
- Reported as the first mobile chip to support LPDDR6 memory
- NPU redesigned for Xiaomi's on-device MiMo AI models: up to 200 TOPS tensor performance, 3.13 TFLOPS vector performance, claimed ~45% on-device AI performance uplift over the O1; adds AI-acceleration units in the CPU and eight neural-network accelerators in the GPU
- Claimed system latency of 82 ns
- Independent analysis found roughly a two-generation leap in power efficiency versus the Xring O1

=== Companion chips announced alongside Xring O3 (2026) ===
- Xring O100 — an AI accelerator/NPU chip on a 6 nm process using 3D wafer-on-wafer (WoW) hybrid-bonding packaging, described as the industry's first 6 nm WoW 3D advanced packaging solution (1.4 µm bonding pitch), supporting Xiaomi's MiMo model on-device with bandwidth up to 1.22 TB/s and inference speeds up to 330 tokens/s.
- Xring D100 — a China's first 3 nm automotive chip intended for Xiaomi's electric vehicles.

== Timeline of Xiaomi chips ==
| Brand | Chip | Category | Announced | Process | Debut device | Status |
|---|---|---|---|---|---|---|
| Surge | S1 | Flagship-tier SoC | February 2017 | TSMC 28 nm | Xiaomi Mi 5C | Released |
| Surge | S2 | Flagship SoC | Rumored 2017–2019 | TSMC 16 nm (planned) | — | Cancelled |
| Surge | C1 | ISP | 2021 | 28 nm | Xiaomi Mi MIX Fold | Released |
| Surge | P1 | Fast-charging chip | December 2021 | — | Xiaomi 12 Pro | Released |
| Surge | P2 | Fast-charging chip (2nd gen) | — | — | — | Released |
| Surge | G1 | Battery-management chip | July 2022 | — | Xiaomi 12S Ultra | Released |
| Surge | T1 | Communications chip | — | — | — | Released |
| "RING" (codename) | | Flagship SoC (pre-launch) | Reported 2024 | — | — | Became Xring O1 |
| Xring | O1 | Flagship SoC | May 2025 | TSMC N3E (3 nm) | Xiaomi 15S Pro / Pad 7 Ultra | Released |
| Xring | T1 | Modem/connectivity chip | May 2025 | — | Wearables | Released |
| Xring | O3 | Flagship SoC | August 2026 | TSMC N3P (3 nm) | Xiaomi 18 Fold | Released |
| Xring | O100 | AI accelerator (NPU) | August 2026 | 6 nm (WoW 3D) | — | Released |
| Xring | D100 | Automotive chip | August 2026 | 3 nm | Xiaomi EVs | Released |

== See also ==
- Pinecone Electronics
- List of Xiaomi products
- ARM Holdings
- TSMC
- Apple silicon
- HiSilicon
