= Xiaomi 18 Fold =

Foldable Android smartphone by Xiaomi

- Brand: Xiaomi
- Manufacturer: Xiaomi
- Type: Foldable smartphone
- First released: 7 September 2026; 2 months ago
- Compatible networks: GSM / CDMA / HSPA / EVDO / LTE / 5G
- Form factor: Phablet
- Colors: Black, Ceramic Special Edition, Warm Gold, Nishino Red
- Dimensions: Folded: 83.6 x 117.8 x 10.7 mm Unfolded: 163.8 x 117.8 x 5.0 mm
- Weight: 219 g (7.72 oz)
- Operating system: Android 17 with Xiaomi HyperOS
- System-on-chip: Xring O3 chip
- CPU: Octa-core (4.35GHz) 3 nm process
- Memory: 12/16 GB RAM
- Storage: 256/512 GB/1 TB UFS 3.1
- Battery: 6,000 mAh
- Charging: 67W wired/50W wireless charging
- Rear camera: 200 MP, f/1.7, 23mm (wide), 1/1.56", 0.5µm, PDAF, OIS; 50 MP, f/2.8, 80mm (telephoto), PDAF, OIS, 3.x optical zoom 50 MP, f/2.4, 17mm (ultrawide)
- Front camera: 16 MP, f/2.2, 21mm (wide)
- Display: 7.58 inches, LTPO AMOLED, 120Hz, HDR10+, Dolby Vision, HDR Vivid, 4000 nits (peak)
- External display: 5.38 inches, LTPO AMOLED, 120Hz, Xiaomi Dragon Crystal Glass 3

The Xiaomi 18 Fold is an Android-based foldable smartphone manufactured by Xiaomi. Unveiled on 07 September 2026, it is Xiaomi's first attempt at a wide foldable smartphone.

== Specifications ==
=== Design ===
Xiaomi 18 Fold
- Nishino Red
- Warm Gold
- Ceramic Special Edition
- Black

=== Hardware ===
==== Display ====
The Xiaomi 18 Fold has two displays, one outer 5.38-inch AMOLED display for when the device is closed and an inner 7.58-inch AMOLED display when unfolded.

==== Processor and battery ====
The phone is powered by the in-house Xring O3 chip and can have either 12 or 16 GB of RAM. It also has a 6,000 mAh battery with 67W wired and 50W wireless charging.

==== Camera ====
The Xiaomi 18 Fold uses a triple rear camera setup. The main camera is powered by a 200-megapixel main camera with f/1.7 aperture with support for OIS. A 50-megapixel periscope telephoto camera is also used with a f/2.8 aperture, 3.5x optical zoom, and 7x optical-quality zoom.

=== Connectivity ===
The Xiaomi 18 Fold supports dual SIM, USB 3.2, Bluetooth 6.0, and Wi-Fi 7.

=== Software ===
The Xiaomi 18 Fold ships with Android 17.

== See also ==
- iPhone Duo
