= Xiaomi =

Chinese multinational electronics company

Coordinates: 40.0457°N 116.3115°E

Xiaomi Corporation

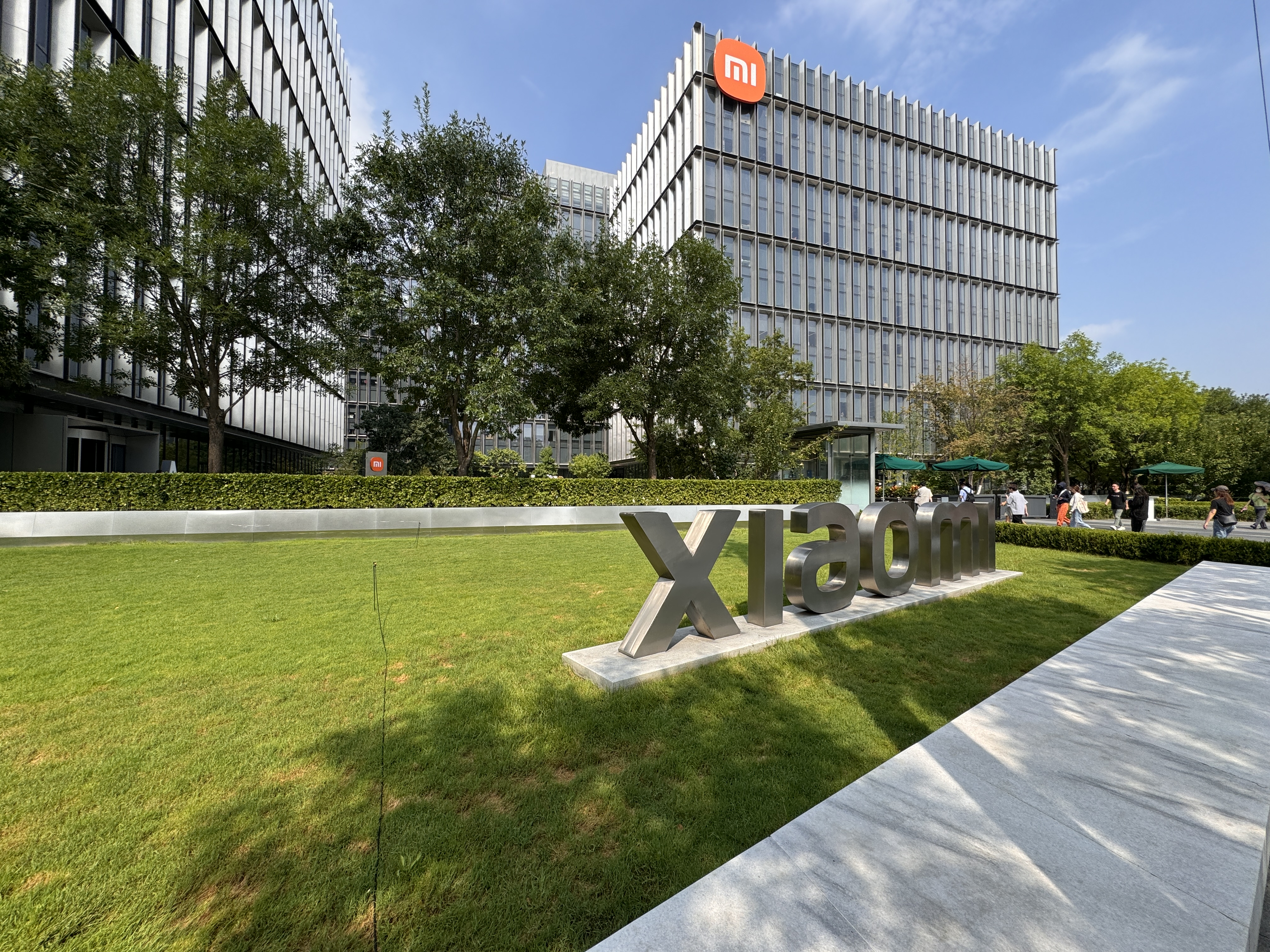
- Headquarters in Beijing
- Trade name: Xiaomi
- Native name: 小米集团
- Romanized name: Xiǎomǐ Jítuán
- Type: Public
- Traded as: SEHK: 1810; Hang Seng Index component
- ISIN: KYG9830T1067
- Industry: Consumer electronics; Computer hardware; Automotive; Artificial intelligence; Crowdfunding; E-commerce
- Founded: 6 April 2010; 16 years ago
- Founders: Lei Jun; Lin Bin
- Headquarters: Beijing, China
- Area served: Worldwide
- Key people: Lei Jun (founder, chairman & CEO); Lin Bin (co-founder & vice-chairman); Lu Weibing (partner & president); Liu De (co-founder, executive director & senior vice president)
- Products: Mobile phones; Personal computers; IoT; Electric vehicles
- Brands: POCO; Redmi
- Revenue: ▲CN¥457.29 billion (2025) (US$68.26 billion)
- Operating income: ▲CN¥47.9 billion (2025) (US$7.15 billion)
- Net income: ▲CN¥41.57 billion (2025) (US$6.21 billion)
- Total assets: ▲CN¥508.1 billion (2025) (US$75.85 billion)
- Total equity: ▲CN¥266.32 billion (2025) (US$39.76 billion)
- Number of employees: 56,531 (2025)
- Subsidiaries: Black Shark; Xiaomi Auto; Zhigu Corporation; ZMI; Youpin (有品)
- Website: mi.com

Xiaomi
- "Xiaomi" in Chinese characters
- Chinese: 小米
- Literal meaning: "Millet"
Transcriptions
Standard Mandarin
- Hanyu Pinyin: Xiǎomǐ
- IPA: [ɕjǎʊ.mì]
Yue: Cantonese
- Hong Kong Romanisation: Siu Mi

Xiaomi (/ˈʃaʊmi/; Chinese: 小米; pinyin: Xiǎomǐ) is a Chinese multinational corporation and technology company headquartered in Beijing, China. It is best known for its consumer electronics, software, and electric vehicles. It is the third-largest smartphone seller in the world as of 2025, behind Apple and Samsung, most of which run on the Xiaomi HyperOS (former MIUI) operating system. It has 754.1 million global monthly active users, as of December 2025. The company is ranked 232nd and is the youngest company on the Fortune Global 500. It has been called the "Apple of China".

Xiaomi was founded in 2010 in Beijing by Lei Jun along with six associates. Lei had worked at Kingsoft as an executive and been involved in the founding and management of Joyo.com, the latter of which was sold to Amazon for $75 million in 2004. In August 2011, Xiaomi released its first smartphone and by 2014 it had the largest market share of smartphones sold in China. Initially the company only sold its products online; however, it later opened brick and mortar stores. By 2015, it was developing a wide range of consumer electronics. In 2020, the company sold 149.4 million smartphones and MIUI had over 500 million monthly active users. As of August 2024, Xiaomi is the second-largest seller of smartphones worldwide, with a market share of about 12%, according to Counterpoint. It has come up with its own range of wearable items. It also is a major manufacturer of appliances including televisions, flashlights, unmanned aerial vehicles, and air purifiers using its Internet of things and Xiaomi Smart Home product ecosystems.

Xiaomi keeps its prices close to its manufacturing and bill of materials costs by keeping most of its products in the market for 18 months, longer than most smartphone companies. The company also uses inventory optimization and flash sales to keep its inventory low.

== History ==
=== 2010–2013 ===
On 6 April 2010, Xiaomi was co-founded by Lei Jun and six others:

- Lin Bin (林斌), vice president of the Google China Institute of Engineering
- Zhou Guangping (周光平), senior director of the Motorola Beijing R&D center
- Liu De (刘德), department chair of the Department of Industrial Design at the University of Science and Technology Beijing
- Li Wanqiang (黎万强), general manager of Kingsoft Dictionary
- Huang Jiangji (黄江吉), principal development manager
- Hong Feng (洪峰), senior product manager for Google China

Lei had worked at Kingsoft as an executive and been involved in the founding and management of Joyo.com, the latter of which was sold to Amazon for $75 million in 2004. At the time of the founding of the company, Lei was dissatisfied with the products of other mobile phone manufacturers and thought he could make a better product.

On 16 August 2010, Xiaomi launched its first Android-based firmware MIUI (Now Xiaomi HyperOS).

In 2010, the company raised $41 million in a Series A round.

In August 2011, the company launched its first phone, the Xiaomi Mi 1. The device had Xiaomi's MIUI firmware along with Android installation.

In December 2011, the company raised $90 million in a Series B round.

In June 2012, the company raised $216 million of funding in a Series C round at a $4 billion valuation. Institutional investors participating in the first round of funding included Temasek Holdings, IDG Capital, Qiming Venture Partners and Qualcomm.

In August 2013, the company hired Hugo Barra from Google, where he served as vice president of product management for the Android platform. He was employed as vice president of Xiaomi to expand the company outside of mainland China, making Xiaomi the first company selling smartphones to poach a senior staffer from Google's Android team. He left the company in February 2017.

In September 2013, Xiaomi announced its Xiaomi Mi 3 smartphone and an Android-based 47-inch 3D-capable Smart TV assembled by Sony TV manufacturer Wistron of Taiwan.

In October 2013, it became the fifth most used smartphone brand in China.

In 2013, Xiaomi sold 18.7 million smartphones.

=== 2014–2020 ===
In February 2014, Xiaomi announced its expansion outside China, with an international headquarters in Singapore.

In April 2014, Xiaomi purchased the domain name mi.com for a record US$3.6 million, the most expensive domain name ever bought in China, replacing xiaomi.com as the company's main domain name.

In September 2014, Xiaomi acquired a 24.7% stake in Roborock.

In December 2014, Xiaomi raised US$1.1 billion at a valuation of over US$45 billion, making it one of the most valuable private technology companies in the world. The financing round was led by Hong Kong-based technology fund All-Stars Investment Limited, a fund run by former Morgan Stanley analyst Richard Ji.

In 2014, the company sold over 60 million smartphones. In 2014, 94% of the company's revenue came from mobile phone sales.

In April 2015, Ratan Tata acquired a stake in Xiaomi.

On 30 June 2015, Xiaomi announced its expansion into Brazil with the launch of locally manufactured Redmi 2; it was the first time the company assembled a smartphone outside of China. However, the company left Brazil in the second half of 2016.

On 26 February 2016, Xiaomi launched the Mi5, powered by the Qualcomm Snapdragon 820 processor.

On 3 March 2016, Xiaomi launched the Redmi Note 3 Pro in India, the first smartphone to be powered by a Qualcomm Snapdragon 650 processor.

On 10 May 2016, Xiaomi launched the Mi Max, powered by the Qualcomm Snapdragon 650/652 processor.

In June 2016, the company acquired patents from Microsoft.

In September 2016, Xiaomi launched sales in the European Union (EU) through a partnership with ABC Data.

Also in September 2016, the Xiaomi Mi Robot vacuum was released by Roborock.

On 26 October 2016, Xiaomi launched the Mi Mix, powered by the Qualcomm Snapdragon 821 processor.

On 22 March 2017, Xiaomi announced that it planned to set up a second manufacturing unit in India in partnership with contract manufacturer Foxconn.

On 19 April 2017, Xiaomi launched the Mi6, powered by the Qualcomm Snapdragon 835 processor.

In July 2017, the company entered into a patent licensing agreement with Nokia.

On 5 September 2017, Xiaomi released Xiaomi Mi A1, the first Android One smartphone under the slogan: Created by Xiaomi, Powered by Google. Xiaomi stated started working with Google for the Mi A1 Android One smartphone earlier in 2017. An alternate version of the phone was also available with MIUI, the MI 5X.

In 2017, Xiaomi opened Mi Stores in India, Pakistan and Bangladesh. The EU's first Mi Store was opened in Athens, Greece in October 2017. In Q3 2017, Xiaomi overtook Samsung to become the largest smartphone brand in India. Xiaomi sold 9.2 million units during the quarter. On 7 November 2017, Xiaomi commenced sales in Spain and western Europe.

In April 2018, Xiaomi announced a smartphone gaming brand called Black Shark. It had 6GB of RAM coupled with Snapdragon 845 SoC, and was priced at $508, which cost less than its competitors.

On 2 May 2018, Xiaomi announced the launch of Mi Music and Mi Video to offer "value-added internet services" in India. On 3 May 2018, Xiaomi announced a partnership with 3 to sell smartphones in the United Kingdom, Ireland, Austria, Denmark, and Sweden.

In May 2018, Xiaomi began selling smart home products in the United States through Amazon.

In June 2018, Xiaomi became a public company via an initial public offering on the Hong Kong Stock Exchange, raising $4.72 billion.

On 7 August 2018, Xiaomi announced that Holitech Technology Co. Ltd., Xiaomi's top supplier, would invest up to $200 million over the next three years to set up a major new plant in India.

In August 2018, the company announced POCO as a mid-range smartphone line, first launching in India.

In Q4 of 2018, the Xiaomi Pocophone F1 became the best-selling smartphone sold online in India. The Pocophone was sometimes referred to as the "flagship killer" for offering high-end specifications at an affordable price. The K in K series stands for killer, as in flagship killer.

The company opened new headquarters in Beijing in July 2019 after almost four years of construction.

In October 2019, the company announced that it would launch more than 10 5G phones in 2020, including the Mi 10/10 Pro with 5G functionality.

On 5 November 2019, Xiaomi announced that it would enter the Japanese market. It established a subsidiary, Xiaomi Japan, as parts of its effort to enter the Japanese smartphone market.

On 17 January 2020, POCO India became a separate sub-brand of Xiaomi with entry-level and mid-range devices, followed by its global counterpart on 24 November 2020.

In March 2020, Xiaomi launched their first foldable phone, the Mi Mix Fold. Powered by Qualcomm Snapdragon 888 with an 8.01-inch foldable AMOLED display when open and a 6.5-inch external display when folded. In March 2020, Xiaomi showcased its new 40W wireless charging solution, which was able to fully charge a smartphone with a 4,000mAh battery from flat in 40 minutes.

In October 2020, Xiaomi became the third-largest smartphone maker in the world by shipment volume, shipping 46.2 million handsets in Q3 2020.

=== Since 2021 ===
Xiaomi logos

2014–2021

2021–present

On 30 March 2021, Xiaomi announced its intention to invest US$10 billion in electric vehicles over the following ten years. On 31 March 2021, Xiaomi announced a new logo for the company, designed by Kenya Hara.

In July 2021, Xiaomi became the second largest smartphone maker in the world, according to Canalys. It also surpassed Apple for the first time in Europe, making it the second-largest in Europe according to Counterpoint.

In August 2021, the company acquired autonomous driving company Deepmotion for $77 million.

In December 2021, Xiaomi announced the Xiaomi 12 and Xiaomi 12 Pro. The phones are powered by the Snapdragon 8 Gen 1 chipset.

In April 2022, Xiaomi officially joined the Car Connectivity Consortium (CCC) board.

In June 2022, Xiaomi established Zhuhai Xinshi Semiconductor Technology Co., Ltd., with a registered capital of 200 million RMB. The business scope includes: integrated circuit manufacturing, integrated circuit chip design and services, integrated circuit chip and product manufacturing, integrated circuit design, manufacturing of specialized equipment for semiconductor devices, manufacturing of semiconductor discrete devices, manufacturing of semiconductor lighting devices etc. The company is jointly held by Xiaomi's affiliated company Hubei Xiaomi Changjiang Industrial Fund Management and others.

In July 2022, Xiaomi and its sub-brand POCO combined held a 42% market share in the Russian smartphone market, ranking first.

On 1 August 2022, Xiaomi India elevated COO Murali Krishnan B as president, responsible for the company's daily operations, services, public affairs, and strategic projects, stating that he would continue to work towards strengthening the company's commitment to the Made in India and Digital India initiatives.

On 3 August 2022, the 2022 Fortune Global 500 list was released, with Xiaomi Group ranking 266th, a rise of 72 positions compared to the previous year.

In December 2022, Xiaomi announced that the global cumulative sales of the Redmi Note series had exceeded 300 million units.

On 28 February 2023, Redmi released a 300W fast charging technology, claiming that it can charge a 4100mAh battery by 10% in just 3 seconds, 50% in 2 minutes and 13 seconds, and fully charge it within 5 minutes.

In September 2023, Huawei and Xiaomi announced they reached a global patent cross-licensing agreement that covers multiple communications technologies including 5G.

In April 2025, Xiaomi announced its venture into large-scale AI models with the introduction of MiMo, marking a shift toward deep AI integration in its product lineup.

In May 2025, Lei Jun announced that the 3nm process mobile phone processor chip XRING O1 independently developed and designed by Xiaomi will be released soon. On 22 May, XRING O1 was officially released and installed on Xiaomi 15S Pro and Xiaomi Pad 7 Ultra.

On 26 June 2025, Xiaomi Auto's first SUV model Xiaomi YU7 was officially launched.

In October 2025, Xiaomi quietly launched a short-drama app in China called Watch Short Dramas (Weiguan Duanju), distributed via Xiaomi’s own app store and promoted as an ad-free, free-to-watch catalogue; reports said it had reached about 20,000 downloads shortly after release.

In 2025, the World Intellectual Property Organization (WIPO)'s Annual PCT Review ranked Xiaomi's number of patent applications published under the PCT System as 8th in the world, with 1,889 patent applications being published during 2024.

On 18 April 2026, Xiaomi released a trillion-parameters Large Language Model, MiMo-V2-Pro and Lei Jun announced that the company planned to invest at least US$8.7 billion in artificial intelligence over the following three years.

== Corporate affairs ==
=== Business trends ===
The key trends for Xiaomi are (as of the financial year ending 31 December):

| | Revenue (HKD bn) | Net profit (HKD bn) |
|---|---|---|
| 2019 | 233 | 11.3 |
| 2020 | 276 | 22.8 |
| 2021 | 395 | 23.3 |
| 2022 | 325 | 2.8 |
| 2023 | 299 | 19.3 |
| 2024 | 397 | 25.7 |
| 2025 | 496 | 45.2 |

=== Corporate identity ===
==== Name etymology ====
Xiǎomǐ (小米) is the Chinese word for "millet". In 2011, its CEO Lei Jun suggested there are more meanings than just the "millet and rice". He linked the xiǎo (小, lit. 'small') part to the Buddhist concept that "a single grain of rice of a Buddhist is as great as a mountain", suggesting that Xiaomi wants to work from the little things, instead of starting by striving for perfection, while mǐ (米) is an acronym for "Mobile Internet" and also "mission impossible", referring to the obstacles encountered in starting the company. He also stated that he thinks the name is cute. In 2012 Lei Jun said that the name is about revolution and being able to bring innovation into a new area. Xiaomi's new "Rifle" processor has given weight to several sources linking the latter meaning to the Chinese Communist Party's "millet and rifle" (小米加步枪) revolutionary idiom during the Second Sino-Japanese War.

==== Logo and mascot ====
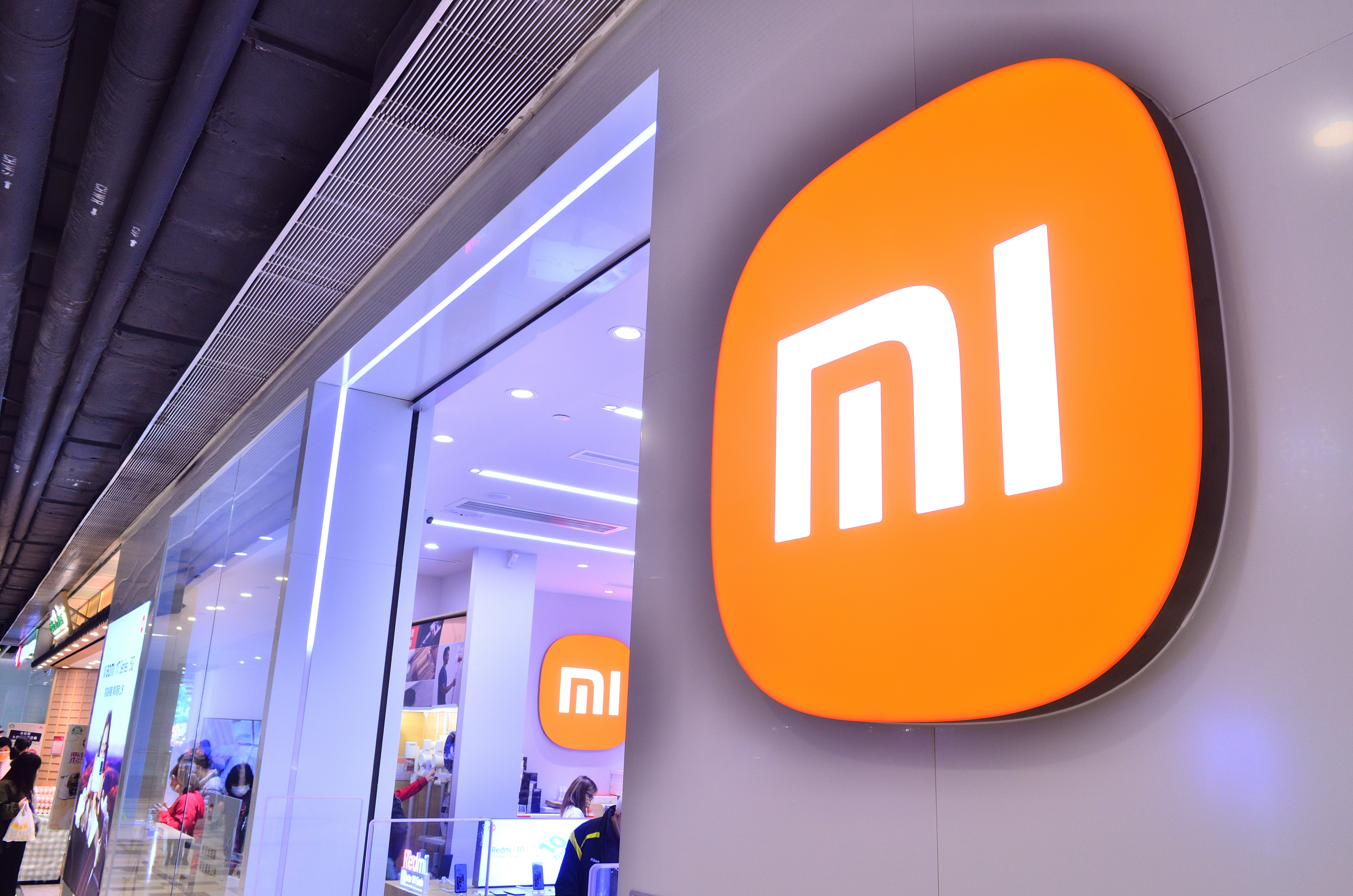
A Mi-Home store with the 2021 new logo

Xiaomi's first logo consisted of a single orange square with the letters "MI" in white located in the center of the square. This logo was in use until 31 March 2021, when a new logo, designed by well-known Japanese designer Kenya Hara, replaced the old one, consisting of the same basic structure as the previous logo, but the square was replaced with a "squircle" with rounded corners instead, and with the letters "MI" remaining identical to the previous logo, along with a slightly darker hue.

Xiaomi's mascot, Mitu, is a white rabbit wearing an Ushanka (known locally as a "Lei Feng hat" in China) with a red star and a red pioneer tie around its neck. Later on, the red star on the hat was replaced by the company's logo.

=== Innovation and development ===
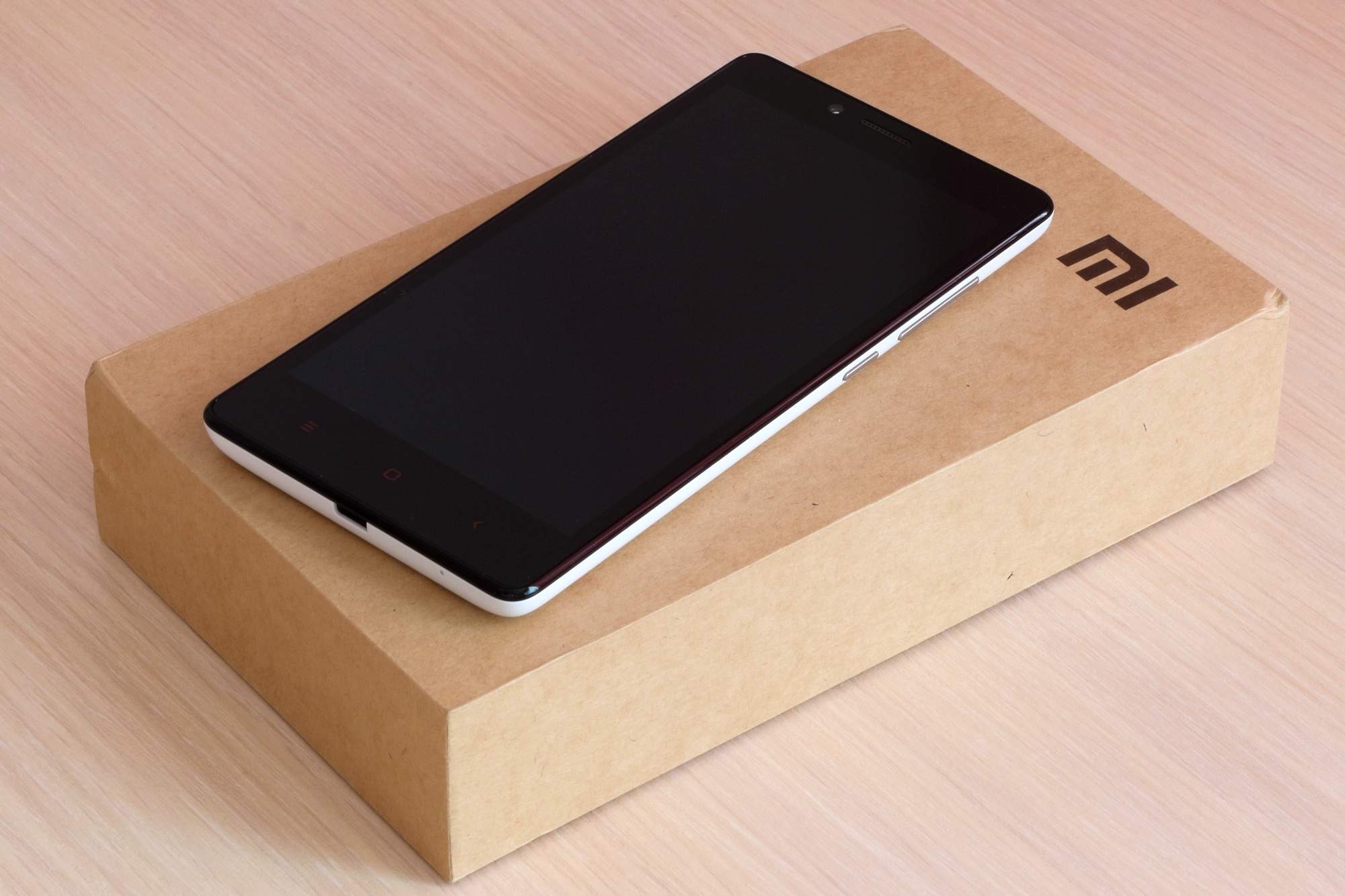
Xiaomi's Redmi Note

On 8 February 2022, Lei released a statement on Weibo to announce plans for Xiaomi to enter the high-end smartphone market and surpass Apple as the top seller of premium smartphones in China in three years. To achieve that goal, Xiaomi will invest US$15.7 billion in R&D over the next five years, and the company will benchmark its products and user experience against Apple's product lines. Lei described the new strategy as a "life-or-death battle for our development" in his Weibo post, after Xiaomi's market share in China contracted over consecutive quarters, from 17% to 14% between Q2 and Q3 2021, dipping further to 13.2% as of Q4 2021.

According to a 2022 report by Canalys, Xiaomi leads Indian smartphone sales in Q1. Xiaomi is one of the leaders of the smartphone makers in India which maintains device affordability.

In 2022, Xiaomi announced and debuted the company's humanoid robot prototype to the public, while the current state of the robot is very limited in its abilities, the announcement was made to mark the companies ambitions to integrate AI into its product designs as well as develop their humanoid robot project into the future.

In the 2024 review of WIPO's annual World Intellectual Property Indicators Xiaomi was ranked as 5th in the world, with 315 designs in industrial design registrations being published under the Hague System during 2023.

In April 2025, Xiaomi released MiMo-7B reasoning model entering in the field of Artificial Intelligence Race.

=== Electric vehicles ===
In 2021, Xiaomi announced a US$10 billion investment into electric vehicles (EVs). In late 2023, Xiaomi Auto unveiled its first production vehicle, the Xiaomi SU7, and publicly announced a goal to become one of the five largest automakers in the world. On 28 March 2024, Xiaomi officially launched the SU7 sedan in Beijing. Xiaomi's SU7 was manufactured under contract with BAIC Group. Xiaomi obtained a production license for electric vehicles in July 2024, allowing it to independently manufacture its electric vehicles. Xiaomi's EV factory, located in the Beijing Economic-Technological Development Area, is centered around its proprietary integrated die casting system, the Hyper Die-Casting 79100 Cluster. This reportedly allows the factory to produce an SU7 every 76 seconds when running at full capacity. Xiaomi was included in Time 2024 list of influential companies. In June 2025, Xiaomi launched the YU7, its first electric SUV. It surpassed 150,000 deliveries.

=== Real estate ===
Xiaomi Youth Apartments in Beijing and Nanjing for US$290 per month. 2658 fully furnished smart homes with Xiaomi white goods.

=== Partnerships ===
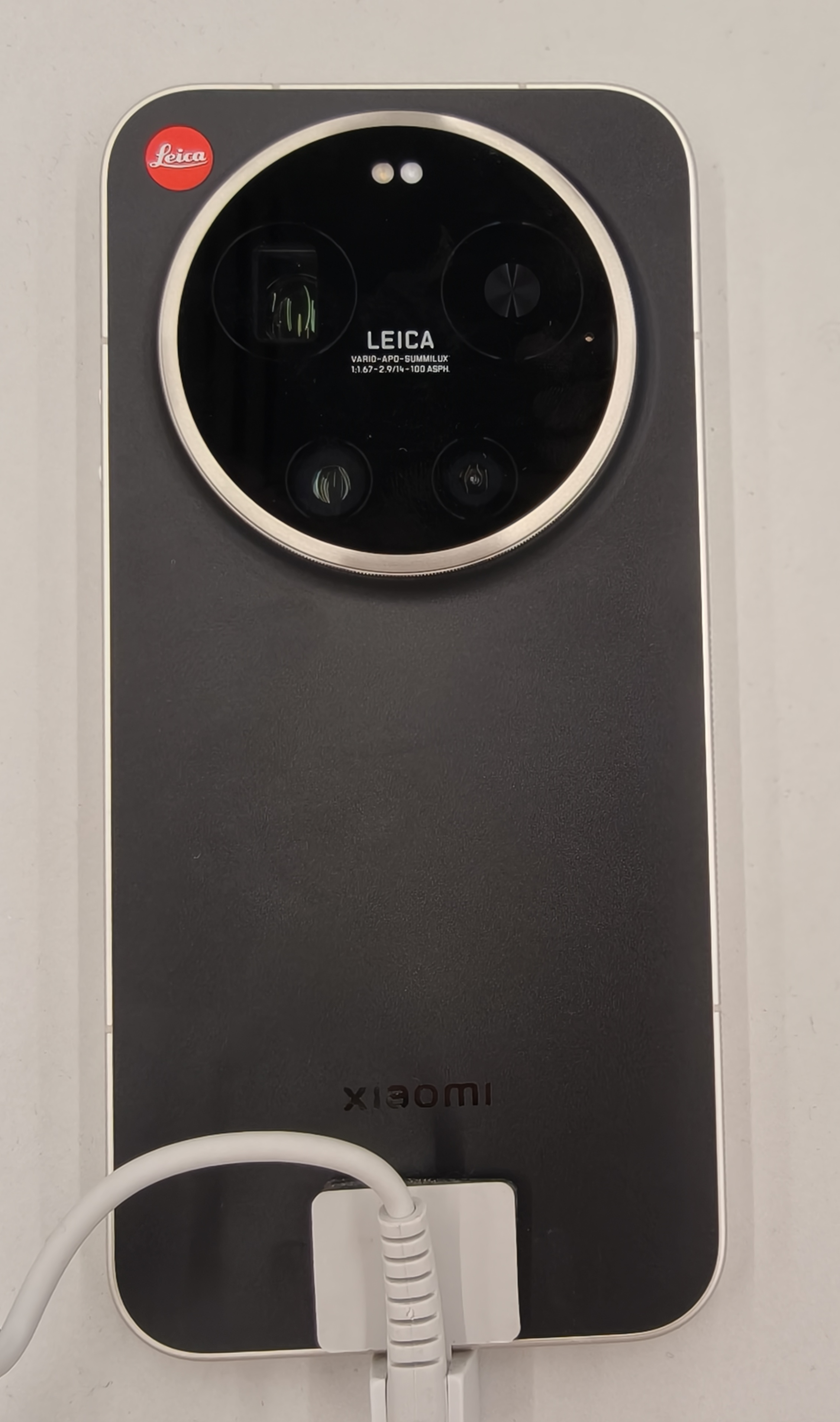
Leica Leitzphone powered by Xiaomi 17 Ultra

In 2021, Harman Kardon collaborated with Xiaomi for its newest smartphone; the Xiaomi Mi 11 series are the first smartphones to feature with Harman Kardon-tuned dual speaker setup.

In 2021, Xiaomi began collaborating with directors to create short films shot entirely using the Xiaomi Mi 11 line of phones. In 2022, they made two shorts with Jessica Henwick. The first, Bus Girl won several awards and was long-listed for Best British Short at the 2023 BAFTA.

In 2022, Leica Camera entered a strategic partnership with Xiaomi to jointly develop Leica cameras to be used in Xiaomi flagship smartphones, succeeding the partnership between Huawei and Leica. The first flagship smartphones under this new partnership were the Xiaomi 12S Ultra and Xiaomi MIX Fold 2, launched in July and August 2022, respectively. In February 2026, the Mobile World Congress announced the Leica Leitzphone powered by Xiaomi 17 Ultra, and be launched in the international market on 6 March 2026.

Xiaomi's mobile device manufacturing plant was inaugurated on 4 March 2022, to begin production in Pakistan. The plant was set up in conjunction with Select Technologies (Pvt) Limited, an Air Link fully owned subsidiary. The production plant is located in Lahore. As of July 2022, the future of the plant is uncertain due to the 2021–2023 global supply chain crisis.

== Reception and controversies ==
=== Business ===
==== Imitation of Apple Inc. ====
Xiaomi was described by some commentaries as imitating Apple Inc. The hunger marketing strategy of Xiaomi was described as riding on the back of the "cult of Apple".

After reading a book about Steve Jobs in college, Xiaomi's chairman and CEO, Lei Jun, carefully cultivated a Steve Jobs image, including jeans, dark shirts, and Jobs' announcement style at Xiaomi's earlier product announcements. He was characterized as a "counterfeit Jobs."

In 2013, critics debated how many of Xiaomi's products were innovative, and how much of their innovation was just really good public relations.

Others point out that while there are similarities to Apple, the ability to customize the software based upon user preferences through the use of Google's Android operating system sets Xiaomi apart. Xiaomi has also developed a much wider range of consumer products than Apple.

==== GNU license compliance ====
In January 2018, Xiaomi was criticized for its non-compliance with the terms of the GNU General Public License. The Android project's Linux kernel is licensed under the copyleft terms of the GPL, which requires Xiaomi to distribute the complete source code of the Android kernel and device trees for every Android device it distributes. By refusing to do so, or by unreasonably delaying these releases, Xiaomi is operating in violation of intellectual property law in China, as a WIPO state. Prominent Android developer Francisco Franco publicly criticized Xiaomi's behaviour after repeated delays in the release of kernel source code. Xiaomi in 2013 said that it would release the kernel code. The kernel source code was available on the GitHub website in 2020.

==== Privacy concerns and data collection ====
As a company based in China, Xiaomi is obligated to share data with the Chinese government under the China Internet Security Law and National Intelligence Law. There were reports that Xiaomi's Cloud messaging service sends some private data, including call logs and contact information, to Xiaomi servers. Xiaomi later released an MIUI update that made cloud messaging optional and that no private data was sent to Xiaomi servers if the cloud messaging service was turned off.

On 23 October 2014, Xiaomi announced that it was setting up servers outside of China for international users, citing improved services and compliance to regulations in several countries.

In May 2025, a team from Princeton University and Citizen Lab published research on encryption protocols used by the top 800 apps from Xiaomi's Mi Store. Researchers found that 47.6% of the tested Mi Store apps use non-standard and weak encryption protocols, enabling third-party eavesdropping on app traffic. The cumulative number of vulnerable app downloads exceeds 130 billion. In comparison, only 3.5% of the top 800 Google Play apps were found to use non-standard and weak encryption.

=== Regulations and lawsuits ===
In November 2012, Xiaomi's smart set-top box stopped working just one week after its launch because the company had violated regulations set by China's National Radio and Television Administration. The regulatory issues were overcome in January 2013.

In August 2014, the Taiwanese Fair Trade Commission investigated the flash sales and found that Xiaomi had sold fewer smartphones than advertised. Xiaomi claimed that the number of smartphones sold was 10,000 units each for the first two flash sales, and 8,000 units for the third one. However, FTC investigated the claims and found that Xiaomi sold 9,339 devices in the first flash sale, 9,492 units in the second one, and 7,389 for the third. It was found that during the first flash sale, Xiaomi had given 1,750 priority ‘F-codes’ to people who could place their orders without having to go through the flash sale, thus diminishing the stock that was publicly available. The FTC fined Xiaomi NT$600,000.

On 9 December 2014, the Delhi High Court granted an ex parte injunction that banned the import and sale of Xiaomi products in India. The injunction was issued in response to a complaint filed by Ericsson in connection with the infringement of its patent licensed under reasonable and non-discriminatory licensing. The injunction was applicable until 5 February 2015, the date on which the High Court was scheduled to summon both parties for a formal hearing of the case. On 16 December, the High Court granted permission to Xiaomi to sell its devices running on a Qualcomm-based processor until 8 January 2015. Xiaomi then held various sales on Flipkart, including one on 30 December 2014. Its flagship Xiaomi Redmi Note 4G phone sold out in six seconds. A judge extended the division bench's interim order, allowing Xiaomi to continue the sale of Qualcomm chipset-based handsets until March 2018.

On 19 January 2021, KPN, a Dutch landline and mobile telecommunications company, sued Xiaomi and others for patent infringement. In October 2023, the Regional Court of Duesseldorf stopped hearing the lawsuit in favor of the request of Xiaomi.

In July 2021, Xiaomi submitted a report to Amazon alleging that Wyze Labs had infringed upon its 2019 "Autonomous Cleaning Device and Wind Path Structure of Same" robot vacuum patent. On 15 July 2021, Wyze filed a lawsuit against Xiaomi in the United States District Court for the Western District of Washington, arguing that prior art exists and asking the court for a declaratory judgment that Xiaomi's 2019 robot vacuum patent is invalid.

In September 2021, amidst a political spat between China and Lithuania, the Lithuanian Ministry of National Defence urged people to dispose the Chinese-made mobile phones and avoid buying new ones, after the National Cyber Security Centre of Lithuania claimed that Xiaomi devices have built-in censorship capabilities that can be turned on remotely. Xiaomi denied the accusations, saying that it "does not censor communications to or from its users", and that they would be engaging a third-party to assess the allegations. They also stated that regarding data privacy, it was compliant with two frameworks for following Europe's General Data Protection Regulation (GDPR), namely its ISO/IEC 27001 Information Security Management Standards and the ISO/IEC 27701 Privacy Information Management System.

In April 2022, India's Enforcement Directorate seized assets from Xiaomi as part of an investigation into violations of foreign exchange laws. The asset seizure was subsequently put on hold by a court order, but later upheld. In May 2022, the Indian court lifted the $725 million freeze on Xiaomi by federal agencies.

In November 2025, a court in Haikou ordered Xiaomi to refund double deposit after losing a lawsuit for requiring advance payment of an Aurora Purple SU7 Max.

=== Sanctions ===
==== United States ====
On 14 January 2021, 5 days before the end of the first presidency of Donald Trump, the United States federal government named Xiaomi as a company "owned or controlled" by the People's Liberation Army and thereby prohibited any American company or individual from investing in it. On 17 February 2021, Xiaomi filed a lawsuit with the United States District Court for the District of Columbia. On 12 March 2021, the federal court blocked the investment ban, expressed skepticism regarding the government's claims of national security concerns, and called the blacklisting was "deeply flawed". Xiaomi denied all allegations of military ties and stated that its products and services were of civilian and commercial use. In May 2021, Xiaomi reached an agreement with the United States Department of Defense to remove the designation of the company as military-linked. Xiaomi CEO Lei Jun in July 2024 said that the reason Xiaomi decided to build cars and set up the Xiaomi electric vehicles company was because of the sanctions list announced by the United States in January 2021.

==== Ukraine ====
Since 2018, Xiaomi has been the top-selling brand in Russian online stores. After the beginning of Russian invasion of Ukraine, Xiaomi suspended marketing in Russia, but in July 2022, Xiaomi and its sub-brand POCO together held 42% of the Russian smartphone market, ranking first in terms of sales. On 13 April 2023, Ukraine's National Agency on Corruption Prevention listed Xiaomi Corporation and 13 Xiaomi senior executives on the agency's list of "international sponsors of war" because the company continued its business in Russia after Russia's invasion and remained a leader in smartphone sales there. On 21 September 2023, some of Finland's mobile carriers (Telia, DNA, and Elisa) halted the sale of Xiaomi Technology products due to the company's ongoing business activities in Russia.

== See also ==
- List of Xiaomi products
- Xiaomi Semiconductor
- Xiaomi Auto
- Xiaomi HyperOS
- Xiaomi MiMo
