= Drag count =

Dimensionless unit

A drag count is a dimensionless unit used by aerospace engineers. 1 drag count is equal to a $C_d$ of 0.0001.

As the drag forces present on automotive vehicles are smaller than for aircraft, 1 drag count is commonly referred to as 0.0001 of $C_d$.

== Definition ==
A drag count $\Delta C_\mathrm d\,$ is defined as:

$\Delta C_\mathrm d = 10^{4} \dfrac{2 F_\mathrm d}{\rho v^2 A}\, ,$

where:

$F_\mathrm d\,$ is the drag force, which is by definition the force component in the direction of the flow velocity, (Note: See lift force and vortex induced vibration for a possible force components transverse to the flow direction.)
$\rho\,$ is the mass density of the fluid, (Note: Note that for the Earth's atmosphere, the air density can be found using the barometric formula. Air is 1.293 kg/m^{3} at 0 °C and 1 atmosphere)
$v\,$ is the speed of the object relative to the fluid, and
$A\,$ is the reference area.

The drag coefficient is used to compare the solutions of different geometries by means of a dimensionless number. A drag count is more user-friendly than the drag coefficient, as the latter is usually much less than 1. A drag count of 200 to 400 is typical for an airplane at cruise. A reduction of one drag count on a subsonic civil transport airplane means about 200 lb (91 kg) more in payload.

== See also ==
- Drag coefficient
- Zero-lift drag coefficient
