= Apple silicon =

System-on-chip processors designed by Apple Inc.

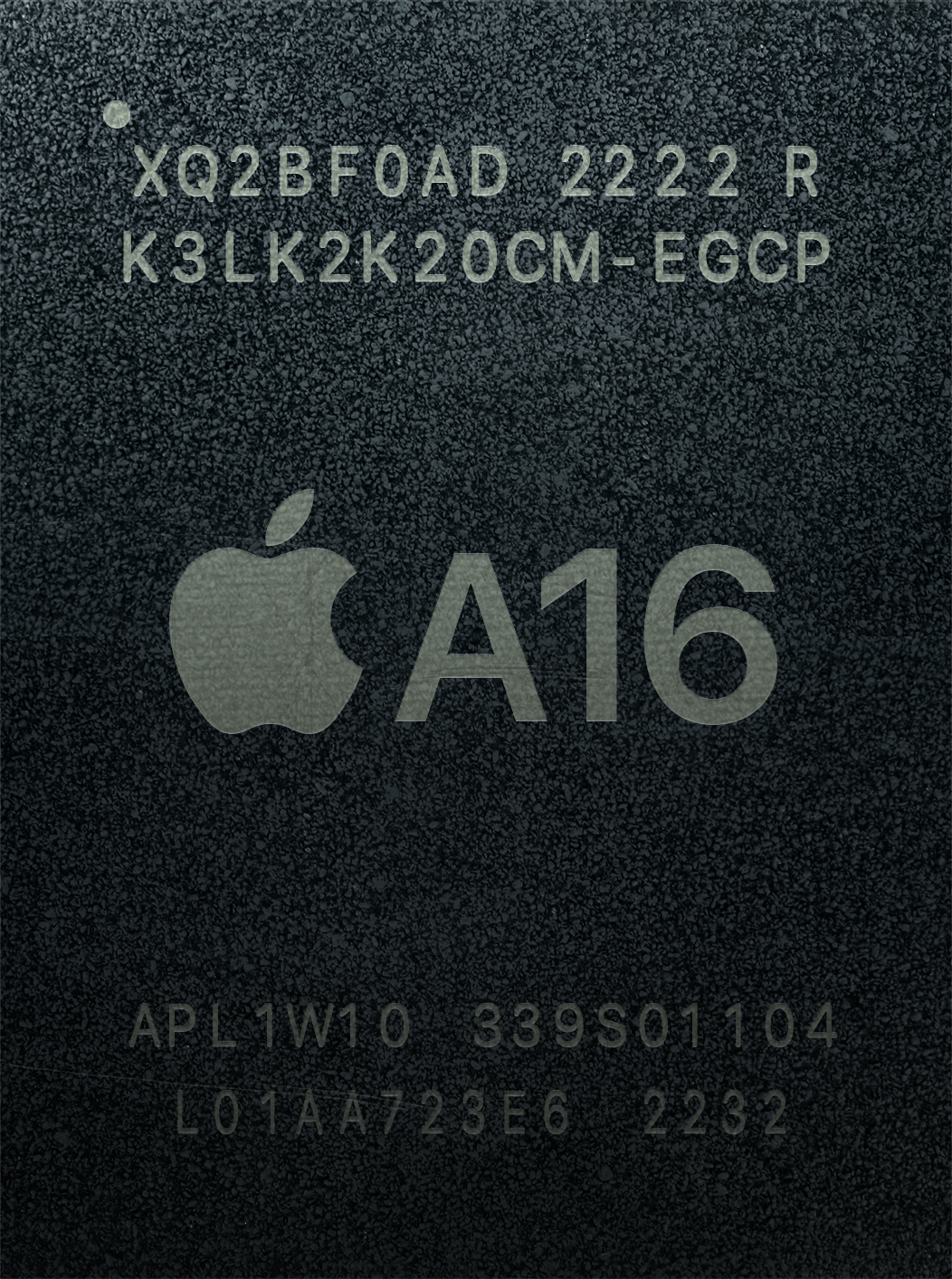
The A16 Bionic chip

Apple silicon is a series of system on a chip (SoC) and system in a package (SiP) designs by Apple Inc., primarily using the ARM architecture, along with a range of more specialized chips for other devices and wireless connectivity functions. They are used across nearly all Apple devices, including Mac, iPhone, iPad, Apple TV, Apple Watch, AirPods, AirTag, HomePod, and Apple Vision Pro.

The first Apple-designed SoC was the Apple A4, introduced in 2010 with the first-generation iPad and subsequently used in the iPhone 4, fourth-generation iPod Touch, and second-generation Apple TV.

At WWDC 2020, Apple announced the transition of the Mac to its own chips and adopted the name Apple silicon for its chip lineup. The first Macs with Apple silicon, built around the Apple M1, were unveiled on November 10, 2020. The Mac lineup completed its transition to Apple silicon in June 2023.

As a fabless manufacturer, Apple designs its chips in-house but outsources production to contract foundries including TSMC and Samsung. Apple controls the integration of its silicon across both its hardware and software products.

Apple also employs chip binning as a cost-reduction strategy. In the binning process, chips with a manufacturing defect, typically a GPU core, have the affected part disabled, converting an otherwise unusable chip into a lower-specification but functional one. This improves manufacturing yield and allows Apple to offer products at different price points without designing separate chips for each tier. Examples include entry-level MacBook Neo models, which have shipped with A-series chips with one or two GPU cores disabled, and the iPhone 17e, which uses a binned A19 with fewer GPU cores than the standard iPhone 17.

Different Apple silicon have different hardware, firmware and software security features. Apple Secure Enclave (inside of Apple silicon) have different hardware, firmware and software security features. The higher the release year number, the higher the number of security features in Apple silicon and Apple Secure Enclave respectively. Apple silicon cryptographic modules are certified to FIPS 140-2 and FIPS 140-3, the higher the release year number, the higher the FIPS security level for hardware, firmware, software. Mac is designed to run any code, so it does not have the feature that prevents unverified code from running on other Apple silicon.

== A-series SoCs ==
The A series is a family of SoCs used in the iPhone, certain iPad models (including iPad Mini and entry-level iPad), MacBook Neo, and the Apple TV. A-series chips were also used in the discontinued iPod Touch line and the original HomePod. They integrate one or more ARM-based processing cores (CPU), a graphics processing unit (GPU), cache memory and other electronics necessary to provide mobile computing functions within a single physical package.

Evolution of Apple A series

A4; March 12, 2010 – September 10, 2013
A5; March 2, 2011 – October 4, 2016
A5X; March 7 – October 23, 2012
A6; September 12, 2012 – September 9, 2015
A6X; October 23, 2012 – October 22, 2013; March 18 – October 16, 2014
A7; September 10, 2013 – March 21, 2017
A8; September 9, 2014 – October 18, 2022
A8X; October 16, 2014 – March 21, 2017
A9; September 9, 2015 – September 12, 2018
A9X; November 9, 2015 – June 5, 2017
A10 Fusion; September 7, 2016 – May 10, 2022
A10X Fusion; June 5, 2017 – April 20, 2021
A11 Bionic; September 12, 2017 – April 15, 2020
A12 Bionic; September 12, 2018 – October 18, 2022
A12X Bionic; October 30, 2018 – March 18, 2020
A13 Bionic; September 10, 2019 – March 3, 2026
A12Z Bionic; March 18, 2020 – April 20, 2021
A14 Bionic; September 15, 2020 – March 4, 2025
A15 Bionic; September 14, 2021 – October 13, 2026
A16 Bionic; September 7, 2022 – present
A17 Pro; September 12, 2023 – October 26, 2026
A18; September 9, 2024 – present
A18 Pro; September 9, 2024 – September 9, 2025; March 4, 2026 – present
A19; September 9, 2025 – present
A19 Pro; September 9, 2025 – present
A20 Pro; September 9, 2026 – present

=== Apple A4 ===
The Apple A4 is a PoP SoC manufactured by Samsung, the first SoC Apple designed in-house. It combines an ARM Cortex-A8 CPU – also used in Samsung's S5PC110A01 SoC – and a PowerVR SGX 535 graphics processor (GPU), all built on Samsung's 45-nanometer silicon chip fabrication process. The design emphasizes power efficiency. The A4 commercially debuted in 2010, in Apple's iPad tablet, and was later used in the iPhone 4 smartphone, the fourth-generation iPod Touch, and the 2nd-generation Apple TV.

The Cortex-A8 core used in the A4, dubbed Hummingbird, is thought to use performance improvements developed by Samsung in collaboration with chip designer Intrinsity, which was subsequently acquired by Apple. It can run at far higher clock rates than other Cortex-A8 designs yet remains fully compatible with the design provided by ARM. The A4 runs at different speeds in different products: 1 GHz in the first iPads and 2nd-generation Apple TV, and 800 MHz in the iPhone 4 and fourth-generation iPod Touch.

The A4's SGX535 GPU could theoretically push 35 million polygons per second and 500 million pixels per second, although real-world performance may be considerably less. Other performance improvements include additional L2 cache.

The A4 processor package does not contain RAM, but supports PoP installation. The 1st-generation iPad, fourth-generation iPod Touch, and the 2nd-generation Apple TV have an A4 mounted with two low-power 128 MB DDR SDRAM chips (totaling 256 MB), while the iPhone 4 has two 256 MB packages for a total of 512 MB. The RAM is connected to the processor using ARM's 64-bit-wide AMBA 3 AXI bus. To give the iPad high graphics bandwidth, the width of the RAM data bus is double that used in previous ARM11- and ARM9-based Apple devices.

=== Apple A5 ===
The Apple A5 is an SoC manufactured by Samsung that replaced the A4. The chip commercially debuted with the release of Apple's iPad 2 tablet in March 2011, followed by its release in the iPhone 4S smartphone later that year. Compared to the A4, the A5 CPU "can do twice the work" and the GPU has "up to nine times the graphics performance", according to Apple.

The A5 contains a dual-core ARM Cortex-A9 CPU with ARM's advanced SIMD extension, marketed as NEON, and a dual core PowerVR SGX543MP2 GPU. This GPU can push between 70 and 80 million polygons/second and has a pixel fill rate of 2 billion pixels/second. The iPad 2's technical specifications page says the A5 is clocked at 1 GHz, though it can adjust its frequency to save battery life. The clock speed of the unit used in the iPhone 4S is 800 MHz. Like the A4, the A5 process size is 45 nm.

An updated 32 nm version of the A5 processor was used in the third-generation Apple TV, the fifth-generation iPod Touch, the iPad Mini, and the new version of iPad 2 (version iPad2,4). The chip in the Apple TV has one core locked. Markings on the square package indicate that it is named APL2498, and in software, the chip is called S5L8942. The 32 nm variant of the A5 provides around 15% better battery life during web browsing, 30% better when playing 3D games and about 20% better battery life during video playback.

In March 2013, Apple released an updated version of the 3rd-generation Apple TV (Rev A, model A1469) containing a smaller, single-core version of the A5 processor. Unlike the other A5 variants, this version of the A5 is not a PoP, having no stacked RAM. The chip is very small, just 6.1×6.2 mm, but as the decrease in size is not due to a decrease in feature size (it is still on a 32 nm fabrication process), this indicates that this A5 revision is of a new design. Markings tell that it is named APL7498, and in software, the chip is called S5L8947.

=== Apple A5X ===
The Apple A5X is an SoC announced on March 7, 2012, at the launch of the third-generation iPad. It is a high-performance variant of the Apple A5; Apple claims it has twice the graphics performance of the A5. It was superseded in the fourth-generation iPad by the Apple A6X processor.

The A5X has a quad-core graphics unit (PowerVR SGX543MP4) instead of the previous dual-core as well as a quad-channel memory controller that provides a memory bandwidth of 12.8 GB/s, roughly three times more than in the A5. The added graphics cores and extra memory channels add up to a very large die size of 165 mm^{2}, for example twice the size of Nvidia Tegra 3. This is mainly due to the large PowerVR SGX543MP4 GPU. The clock frequency of the dual ARM Cortex-A9 cores have been shown to operate at the same 1 GHz frequency as in A5. The RAM in A5X is separate from the main CPU package.

=== Apple A6 ===
The Apple A6 is a PoP SoC introduced on September 12, 2012, at the launch of the iPhone 5, then a year later was inherited by its minor successor the iPhone 5C. Apple states that it is up to twice as fast and has up to twice the graphics power compared to its predecessor the Apple A5. It is 22% smaller and draws less power than the 45 nm A5.

The A6 is said to use a 1.3 GHz custom Apple-designed ARMv7 based dual-core CPU, called Swift, rather than a licensed CPU from ARM like in previous designs, and an integrated 266 MHz triple-core PowerVR SGX 543MP3 graphics processing unit (GPU). The Swift core in the A6 uses a new tweaked instruction set, ARMv7s, featuring some elements of the ARM Cortex-A15 such as support for the Advanced SIMD v2, and VFPv4. The A6 is manufactured by Samsung on a high-κ metal gate (HKMG) 32 nm process.

=== Apple A6X ===
Apple A6X is an SoC introduced at the launch of the fourth-generation iPad on October 23, 2012. It is a high-performance variant of the Apple A6. Apple claims the A6X has twice the CPU performance and up to twice the graphics performance of its predecessor, the Apple A5X.

Like the A6, this SoC continues to use the dual-core Swift CPU, but it has a new quad core GPU, quad channel memory and slightly higher 1.4 GHz CPU clock rate. It uses an integrated quad-core PowerVR SGX 554MP4 graphics processing unit (GPU) running at 300 MHz and a quad-channel memory subsystem. Compared to the A6 the A6X is 30% larger, but it continues to be manufactured by Samsung on a high-κ metal gate (HKMG) 32 nm process.

=== Apple A7 ===
The Apple A7 is a 64-bit PoP SoC whose first appearance was in the iPhone 5S, which was introduced on September 10, 2013. The chip would also be used in the iPad Air, iPad Mini 2 and iPad Mini 3. Apple states that it is up to twice as fast and has up to twice the graphics power compared to its predecessor, the Apple A6. The Apple A7 chip is the first 64-bit chip to be used in a smartphone and later a tablet computer. It includes a dedicated Secure Enclave Processor to help store and protect the data from the Touch ID fingerprint sensor on the iPhone 5S and iPad mini 3.

The A7 features an Apple-designed 1.3–1.4 GHz 64-bit ARMv8-A dual-core CPU, called Cyclone, and an integrated PowerVR G6430 GPU in a four cluster configuration. The ARMv8-A architecture doubles the number of registers of the A7 compared to the A6. It now has 31 general-purpose registers that are each 64-bits wide and 32 floating-point/NEON registers that are each 128-bits wide. The A7 is manufactured by Samsung on a high-κ metal gate (HKMG) 28 nm process and the chip includes over 1 billion transistors on a die 102 mm^{2} in size.

=== Apple A8 ===
The Apple A8 is a 64-bit PoP SoC manufactured by TSMC. Its first appearance was in the iPhone 6 and iPhone 6 Plus, which were introduced on September 9, 2014. A year later it would drive the iPad Mini 4. Apple states that it has 25% more CPU performance and 50% more graphics performance while drawing only 50% of the power compared to its predecessor, the Apple A7. On February 9, 2018, Apple released the HomePod, which is powered by an Apple A8 with 1 GB of RAM.

The A8 features an Apple-designed 1.4 GHz 64-bit ARMv8-A dual-core CPU, and an integrated custom PowerVR GX6450 GPU in a four cluster configuration. The GPU features custom shader cores and compiler. The A8 is manufactured on a 20 nm process by TSMC, which replaced Samsung as the manufacturer of Apple's mobile device processors. It contains 2 billion transistors. Despite that being double the number of transistors compared to the A7, its physical size has been reduced by 13% to 89 mm^{2} (consistent with a shrink only, not known to be a new microarchitecture).

=== Apple A8X ===
The Apple A8X is a 64-bit SoC introduced at the launch of the iPad Air 2 on October 16, 2014. It is a high performance variant of the Apple A8. Apple states that it has 40% more CPU performance and 2.5 times the graphics performance of its predecessor, the Apple A7.

Unlike the A8, this SoC uses a triple-core CPU, a new octa-core GPU, dual channel memory and slightly higher 1.5 GHz CPU clock rate. It uses an integrated custom octa-core PowerVR GXA6850 graphics processing unit (GPU) running at 450 MHz and a dual-channel memory subsystem. It is manufactured by TSMC on their 20 nm fabrication process, and consists of 3 billion transistors.

=== Apple A9 ===
The Apple A9 is a 64-bit ARM-based SoC that first appeared in the iPhone 6S and 6S Plus, which were introduced on September 9, 2015. Apple states that it has 70% more CPU performance and 90% more graphics performance compared to its predecessor, the Apple A8. It is dual sourced, a first for an Apple SoC; it is manufactured by Samsung on their 14 nm FinFET LPE process and by TSMC on their 16 nm FinFET process. It was subsequently included in the first-generation iPhone SE, and the iPad (5th generation). The Apple A9 was the last CPU that Apple manufactured through a contract with Samsung, as all A-series chips after are manufactured by TSMC. The Apple A9 runs on a higher 1.85 GHz clock speed.

=== Apple A9X ===
The Apple A9X is a 64-bit SoC that was announced on September 9, 2015, and released on November 11, 2015, and first appeared in the iPad Pro. It offers 80% more CPU performance and two times the GPU performance of its predecessor, the Apple A8X. It is manufactured by TSMC using a 16 nm FinFET process. Unlike its predecessor, the A8X, the Apple A9X runs on an increased 2.16 to 2.26 GHz clock rate.

=== Apple A10 Fusion ===
The Apple A10 Fusion is a 64-bit ARM-based SoC that first appeared in the iPhone 7 and 7 Plus, which were introduced on September 7, 2016. The A10 is also featured in the sixth-generation iPad, seventh-generation iPad and seventh-generation iPod Touch. It has a new ARM big.LITTLE quad core design with two high performance cores, and two smaller highly efficient cores. It is 40% faster than the A9, with 50% faster graphics, and runs at an improved 2.34 GHz clock rate. It is manufactured by TSMC on their 16 nm FinFET process.

=== Apple A10X Fusion ===
The Apple A10X Fusion is a 64-bit ARM-based SoC that first appeared in the 10.5″ iPad Pro and the second generation of the 12.9″ iPad Pro, which were both announced on June 5, 2017. It is a variant of the A10 and Apple claims that it has 30 percent faster CPU performance and 40 percent faster GPU performance than its predecessor, the A9X. On September 12, 2017, Apple announced that the Apple TV 4K would be powered by an A10X chip. It is made by TSMC on their 10 nm FinFET process, and its base clock speed is 2.36 GHz, although some sources say that it is 2.38 GHz.

=== Apple A11 Bionic ===
The Apple A11 Bionic is a 64-bit ARM-based SoC that first appeared in the iPhone 8, iPhone 8 Plus, and iPhone X, which were introduced on September 12, 2017. It has two high-performance cores, which are 25% faster than the A10 Fusion, four high-efficiency cores, which are 70% faster than the energy-efficient cores in the A10, and for the first time an Apple-designed three-core GPU with 30% faster graphics performance than the A10. It is also the first A-series chip to feature Apple's "Neural Engine," which enhances artificial intelligence and machine learning processes.

=== Apple A12 Bionic ===
The Apple A12 Bionic is a 64-bit ARM-based SoC that first appeared in the iPhone XS, XS Max and XR, which were introduced on September 12, 2018. It is also used in the third-generation iPad Air, fifth-generation iPad Mini, the eighth-generation iPad, and the second generation Apple TV 4K. It has two high-performance cores, which are 15% faster than the A11 Bionic, and four high-efficiency cores, which have 50% lower power usage than the energy-efficient cores in the A11 Bionic. The A12 is manufactured by TSMC using a 7 nm FinFET process, the first to ship in a smartphone.

=== Apple A12X Bionic ===
The Apple A12X Bionic is a 64-bit ARM-based SoC that first appeared in the 11″ iPad Pro and the third generation of the 12.9″ iPad Pro, which were both announced on October 30, 2018. It offers 35% faster single-core and 90% faster multi-core CPU performance than its predecessor, the A10X. It has four high-performance cores and four high-efficiency cores. The A12X is manufactured by TSMC using a 7 nm FinFET process.

==== Apple A12Z Bionic ====
The Apple A12Z Bionic is an updated version of the A12X Bionic, first appearing in the fourth generation iPad Pro, which was announced on March 18, 2020. It adds an additional GPU core, compared to the A12X, for improved graphics performance. The A12Z is also used in the Developer Transition Kit prototype computer that helps developers prepare their software for Macs based on Apple silicon.

=== Apple A13 Bionic ===
The Apple A13 Bionic is a 64-bit ARM-based SoC that first appeared in the iPhone 11, 11 Pro, and 11 Pro Max, which were introduced on September 10, 2019. It is also featured in the second-generation iPhone SE (released April 15, 2020), the 9th generation iPad (announced September 14, 2021) and in the Studio Display (announced March 8, 2022)

The entire A13 SoC features a six-core CPU, four-core GPU, and an eight-core Neural Engine, which is dedicated to handling on-board machine learning processes; four of the six cores on the CPU are low-powered cores that are dedicated to handling less CPU-intensive operations, such as voice calls, browsing the Web, and sending messages, while two higher-performance cores are used only for more CPU-intensive processes, such as recording 4K video or playing a video game.

=== Apple A14 Bionic ===
The Apple A14 Bionic is a 64-bit ARM-based SoC that first appeared in the fourth-generation iPad Air, iPhone 12 and iPhone 12 Pro, released on October 23, 2020. It is the first commercially available 5nm chipset and contains 11.8 billion transistors and a 16-core Neural Engine. It includes the Samsung LPDDR4X DRAM, a 6-core CPU, and a 4-core GPU with real-time machine learning capabilities. It was later used in the tenth-generation iPad, released on October 26, 2022.

=== Apple A15 Bionic ===
The Apple A15 Bionic is a 64-bit ARM-based SoC that first appeared in the iPhone 13 and iPhone 13 Pro, unveiled on September 14, 2021. The A15 is built on a 5-nanometer manufacturing process with 15 billion transistors. It has 2 high-performance processing cores, 4 high-efficiency cores, new 5-core graphics for iPhone 13 Pro series (4-core for iPhone 13 and 13 mini), and a new 16-core Neural Engine capable of 15.8 trillion operations per second. It is also used in the third-generation iPhone SE, iPhone 14, iPhone 14 Plus and sixth-generation iPad Mini, as well as the third generation Apple TV 4K, with a 5-core CPU.

=== Apple A16 Bionic ===
The Apple A16 Bionic is a 64-bit ARM-based SoC that first appeared in the iPhone 14 Pro, unveiled on September 7, 2022. The A16 has 16 billion transistors and is built on TSMC's N4P fabrication process, being touted by Apple as the first 4 nm processor in a smartphone. However, N4 is an enhanced version of N5 technology, a de facto fourth-generation 5 nm manufacturing process. The chip has 2 high-performance processing cores, 4 high-efficiency cores and 5-core graphics. Memory is upgraded to LPDDR5 for 50% higher bandwidth and a 7% faster 16-core Neural Engine capable of 17 trillion operations per second. It was later used in the iPhone 15 and iPhone 15 Plus, as well as the iPad 11-inch, with a 5-core CPU and 4-core GPU.

=== Apple A17 Pro ===
The Apple A17 Pro is a 64-bit ARM-based SoC that first appeared in the iPhone 15 Pro, unveiled on September 12, 2023. It is Apple's first 3 nm SoC. The chip has 2 high-performance processing cores, 4 high-efficiency cores, a 6-core GPU, and a 16-core Neural Engine capable of 35 trillion operations per second. The GPU was described as their biggest redesign in the history of Apple GPUs, adding hardware accelerated ray tracing and mesh shading support. It is also used in the iPad Mini, with a 5-core GPU.

=== Apple A18 and Apple A18 Pro ===
The Apple A18 and Apple A18 Pro are 64-bit ARM-based SoCs designed by Apple that first appeared in the iPhone 16 and iPhone 16 Pro respectively, unveiled on September 9, 2024. Both SoCs are built on TSMC's N3E process and have 2 high-performance cores and 4 high-efficiency cores. The A18 has 5-core graphics (4-core for iPhone 16e), while the A18 Pro has 6-core graphics. The A18 and A18 Pro use LPDDR5X for 17% higher memory bandwidth, and the 16-core Neural Engine has the same quoted power as the A17 Pro. The A18 Pro is also used in the MacBook Neo, with a 5-core GPU.

=== Apple A19 and Apple A19 Pro ===
The Apple A19 and Apple A19 Pro are 64-bit ARM-based SoCs designed by Apple that first appeared in the iPhone 17, iPhone Air, and iPhone 17 Pro respectively, unveiled on September 9, 2025. Both SoCs are built on TSMC's N3P process and have 2 high-performance cores and 4 high-efficiency cores. The A19 has 5-core graphics (4-core for iPhone 17e), while the A19 Pro has 6-core graphics (5-core for iPhone Air). The A19 and A19 Pro are used in the Studio Display (2026) and Studio Display XDR, respectively. The A19 is also used in the Apple TV 4K (4th generation).

=== Apple A20 Pro ===
The Apple A20 Pro is a 64-bit ARM-based SoC designed by Apple that first appeared in the iPhone 18 Pro and iPhone Duo, unveiled on September 9, 2026. It is Apple's second 2 nm SoC. The chip has 2 super cores, 4 high-efficiency cores, a 7-core GPU, and a dual 16-core Neural Engine. The A20 Pro is also used in the iPad Mini, with a 5-core CPU and 16-core Neural Engine on models with lower storage capacity.

=== Comparison of A-series processors ===
General				Semiconductor technology				Computer architecture		CPU											GPU						AI accelerator		Memory technology					First release
Name	Codename	Part number	Image	Node	Manufacturer	Transistors count	Die size	CPU ISA	Bit width	Performance core			Efficiency core			Overall cores	Cache				Vendor	Cores	SIMD EU count	FP32 ALU count	Frequency	FP32 FLOPS	Cores	OPS	Memory bus width	Total channel Bit per channel	Memory type	Theoretical bandwidth	Available capacity	First release
Name	Codename	Part number	Image	Node	Manufacturer	Transistors count	Die size	CPU ISA	Bit width	Core name	Cores	Core speed	Core name	Cores	Core speed	Overall cores	L1	L2	L3	SLC	Vendor	Cores	SIMD EU count	FP32 ALU count	Frequency	FP32 FLOPS	Cores	OPS	Memory bus width	Total channel Bit per channel	Memory type	Theoretical bandwidth	Available capacity	First release
	APL0098	S5L8900		90 nm	Samsung		72 mm^{2}	ARMv6	32-bit	ARM11	1	412 MHz	—N/a	—N/a	—N/a	Single-core	L1i: 16 KB; L1d: 16 KB	—N/a	—N/a	—N/a	PowerVR; MBX Lite	1	1	8	60 MHz – 103 MHz	0.96 GFLOPS – 1.64 GFLOPS	—N/a	—N/a	16-bit	1 channel 16-bit/channel	LPDDR-266 (133.25; MHz)	533 MB/s	128 MB	June 29, 2007
	APL0278	S5L8720		65 nm	Samsung		36 mm^{2}	ARMv6	32-bit	ARM11	1	533 MHz	—N/a	—N/a	—N/a	Single-core	L1i: 16 KB; L1d: 16 KB	—N/a	—N/a	—N/a	PowerVR; MBX Lite	1	1	8	103 MHz – 133 MHz	1.64 GFLOPs – 2.12 GFLOPS	—N/a	—N/a	32-bit	1 channel 32-bit/channel	LPDDR-266 (133.25; MHz)	1066 MB/s	128 MB	July 11, 2008
	APL0298	S5L8920		65 nm	Samsung		71.8 mm^{2}	ARMv7	32-bit	Cortex-A8	1	600 MHz	—N/a	—N/a	—N/a	Single-core	L1i: 32 KB; L1d: 32 KB	256 KB	—N/a	—N/a	PowerVR; SGX535	1	2	16	200 MHz	6.4 GFLOPS	—N/a	—N/a	32-bit	1 channel 32-bit/channel	LPDDR-400 (200 MHz)	1.6 GB/s	256 MB	June 19, 2009
	APL2298	S5L8922		45 nm	Samsung		41.6 mm^{2}	ARMv7	32-bit	Cortex-A8	1	600 MHz	—N/a	—N/a	—N/a	Single-core	L1i: 32 KB; L1d: 32 KB	256 KB	—N/a	—N/a	PowerVR; SGX535	1	2	16	200 MHz	6.4 GFLOPS	—N/a	—N/a	32-bit	1 channel 32-bit/channel	LPDDR-400 (200 MHz)	1.6 GB/s	256 MB	September 9, 2009
A4	APL0398	S5L8930		45 nm	Samsung		53.3 mm^{2}	ARMv7	32-bit	Cortex-A8	1	800 MHz	—N/a	—N/a	—N/a	Single-core	L1i: 32 KB; L1d: 32 KB	512 KB	—N/a	—N/a	PowerVR; SGX535	1	2	16	200 MHz – 250 MHz	6.4 GFLOPS – 8.0 GFLOPS	—N/a	—N/a	64-bit	2 channels 32-bit/channel	LPDDR-400 (200 MHz)	3.2 GB/s	256 MB	April 3, 2010
A4	APL0398	S5L8930		45 nm	Samsung		53.3 mm^{2}	ARMv7	32-bit	Cortex-A8	1	1.0 GHz	—N/a	—N/a	—N/a	Single-core	L1i: 32 KB; L1d: 32 KB	512 KB	—N/a	—N/a	PowerVR; SGX535	1	2	16	200 MHz – 250 MHz	6.4 GFLOPS – 8.0 GFLOPS	—N/a	—N/a	64-bit	2 channels 32-bit/channel	LPDDR-400 (200 MHz)	3.2 GB/s	256 MB	April 3, 2010
A4	APL0398	S5L8930		45 nm	Samsung		53.3 mm^{2}	ARMv7	32-bit	Cortex-A8	1	800 MHz	—N/a	—N/a	—N/a	Single-core	L1i: 32 KB; L1d: 32 KB	512 KB	—N/a	—N/a	PowerVR; SGX535	1	2	16	200 MHz – 250 MHz	6.4 GFLOPS – 8.0 GFLOPS	—N/a	—N/a	64-bit	2 channels 32-bit/channel	LPDDR-400 (200 MHz)	3.2 GB/s	512 MB	April 3, 2010
A5	APL0498	S5L8940		45 nm	Samsung		122.2 mm^{2}	ARMv7	32-bit	Cortex-A9	2	800 MHz	—N/a	—N/a	—N/a	Dual-core	L1i: 32 KB; L1d: 32 KB	1 MB	—N/a	—N/a	PowerVR; SGX543	2	4	32	200 MHz	12.8 GFLOPS	—N/a	—N/a	64-bit	2 channels 32-bit/channel	LPDDR2-800 (400 MHz)	6.4 GB/s	512 MB	March 11, 2011
A5	APL0498	S5L8940		45 nm	Samsung		122.2 mm^{2}	ARMv7	32-bit	Cortex-A9	2	1.0 GHz	—N/a	—N/a	—N/a	Dual-core	L1i: 32 KB; L1d: 32 KB	1 MB	—N/a	—N/a	PowerVR; SGX543	2	4	32	200 MHz	12.8 GFLOPS	—N/a	—N/a	64-bit	2 channels 32-bit/channel	LPDDR2-800 (400 MHz)	6.4 GB/s	512 MB	March 11, 2011
A5	APL2498	S5L8942		32 nm Hκ MG	Samsung		69.6 mm^{2}	ARMv7	32-bit	Cortex-A9	2	800 MHz	—N/a	—N/a	—N/a	Dual-core	L1i: 32 KB; L1d: 32 KB	1 MB	—N/a	—N/a	PowerVR; SGX543	2	4	32	200 MHz	12.8 GFLOPS	—N/a	—N/a	64-bit	2 channels 32-bit/channel	LPDDR2-800 (400 MHz)	6.4 GB/s	512 MB	March 7, 2012
A5	APL2498	S5L8942		32 nm Hκ MG	Samsung		69.6 mm^{2}	ARMv7	32-bit	Cortex-A9	2	1.0 GHz	—N/a	—N/a	—N/a	Dual-core	L1i: 32 KB; L1d: 32 KB	1 MB	—N/a	—N/a	PowerVR; SGX543	2	4	32	200 MHz	12.8 GFLOPS	—N/a	—N/a	64-bit	2 channels 32-bit/channel	LPDDR2-800 (400 MHz)	6.4 GB/s	512 MB	March 7, 2012
A5	APL2498	S5L8942		32 nm Hκ MG	Samsung		69.6 mm^{2}	ARMv7	32-bit	Cortex-A9	2 (Note: 1 core locked)	1.0 GHz	—N/a	—N/a	—N/a	Dual-core (Note: Single-core due to locked core)	L1i: 32 KB; L1d: 32 KB	1 MB	—N/a	—N/a	PowerVR; SGX543	2	4	32	200 MHz	12.8 GFLOPS	—N/a	—N/a	64-bit	2 channels 32-bit/channel	LPDDR2-800 (400 MHz)	6.4 GB/s	512 MB	March 7, 2012
A5	APL7498	S5L8947		32 nm Hκ MG	Samsung		37.8 mm^{2}	ARMv7	32-bit	Cortex-A9	1	1.0 GHz	—N/a	—N/a	—N/a	Single-core	L1i: 32 KB; L1d: 32 KB	1 MB	—N/a	—N/a	PowerVR; SGX543	2	4	32	200 MHz	12.8 GFLOPS	—N/a	—N/a	64-bit	2 channels 32-bit/channel	LPDDR2-800 (400 MHz)	6.4 GB/s	512 MB	January 28, 2013
A5X	APL5498	S5L8945		45 nm	Samsung		165 mm^{2}	ARMv7	32-bit	Cortex-A9	2	1.0 GHz	—N/a	—N/a	—N/a	Dual-core	L1i: 32 KB; L1d: 32 KB	1 MB	—N/a	—N/a	PowerVR; SGX543	4	8	64	200 MHz	25.6 GFLOPS	—N/a	—N/a	128-bit	4 channels 32-bit/channel	LPDDR2-800 (400 MHz)	12.8 GB/s	1 GB	March 16, 2012
A6	APL0598	S5L8950		32 nm Hκ MG	Samsung		96.71 mm^{2}	ARMv7s	32-bit	Swift	2	1.3 GHz	—N/a	—N/a	—N/a	Dual-core	L1i: 32 KB; L1d: 32 KB	1 MB	—N/a	—N/a	PowerVR; SGX543	3	6	48	266 or 709 MHz	25.5 or 68.0 GFLOPS	—N/a	—N/a	64-bit	2 channels 32-bit/channel	LPDDR2-1066 (533 MHz)	8.5 GB/s	1 GB	September 21, 2012
A6X	APL5598	S5L8955		32 nm Hκ MG	Samsung		123 mm^{2}	ARMv7s	32-bit	Swift	2	1.4 GHz	—N/a	—N/a	—N/a	Dual-core	L1i: 32 KB; L1d: 32 KB	1 MB	—N/a	—N/a	PowerVR; SGX554	4	16	128	300 MHz	76.8 GFLOPS	—N/a	—N/a	128-bit	4 channels 32-bit/channel	LPDDR2-1066 (533 MHz)	17.0 GB/s	1 GB	November 2, 2012
A7	APL0698	S5L8960		28 nm Hκ MG	Samsung	1 billion	102 mm^{2}	ARMv8.0-A	64-bit	Cyclone	2	1.3 GHz	—N/a	—N/a	—N/a	Dual-core	L1i: 64 KB; L1d: 64 KB	1 MB	4 MB (Inclusive)	—N/a	PowerVR; G6430	4	16	128	450 MHz	115.2 GFLOPS	—N/a	—N/a	64-bit	1 channel 64-bit/channel	LPDDR3-1600 (800 MHz)	12.8 GB/s	1 GB	September 20, 2013
A7	APL5698	S5L8965		28 nm Hκ MG	Samsung	1 billion	102 mm^{2}	ARMv8.0-A	64-bit	Cyclone	2	1.4 GHz	—N/a	—N/a	—N/a	Dual-core	L1i: 64 KB; L1d: 64 KB	1 MB	4 MB (Inclusive)	—N/a	PowerVR; G6430	4	16	128	450 MHz	115.2 GFLOPS	—N/a	—N/a	64-bit	1 channel 64-bit/channel	LPDDR3-1600 (800 MHz)	12.8 GB/s	1 GB	November 1, 2013
A8	APL1011	T7000		20 nm Hκ MG	TSMC	2 billion	89 mm^{2}	ARMv8.0-A	64-bit	Typhoon	2	1.1 GHz	—N/a	—N/a	—N/a	Dual-core	L1i: 64 KB; L1d: 64 KB	1 MB	4 MB (Inclusive)	—N/a	PowerVR; GX6450	4	16	128	533 MHz	136.4 GFLOPS	—N/a	—N/a	64-bit	1 channel 64-bit/channel	LPDDR3-1600 (800 MHz)	12.8 GB/s	1 GB	September 19, 2014
A8	APL1011	T7000		20 nm Hκ MG	TSMC	2 billion	89 mm^{2}	ARMv8.0-A	64-bit	Typhoon	2	1.4 GHz	—N/a	—N/a	—N/a	Dual-core	L1i: 64 KB; L1d: 64 KB	1 MB	4 MB (Inclusive)	—N/a	PowerVR; GX6450	4	16	128	533 MHz	136.4 GFLOPS	—N/a	—N/a	64-bit	1 channel 64-bit/channel	LPDDR3-1600 (800 MHz)	12.8 GB/s	1 GB	September 19, 2014
A8	APL1011	T7000		20 nm Hκ MG	TSMC	2 billion	89 mm^{2}	ARMv8.0-A	64-bit	Typhoon	2	1.5 GHz	—N/a	—N/a	—N/a	Dual-core	L1i: 64 KB; L1d: 64 KB	1 MB	4 MB (Inclusive)	—N/a	PowerVR; GX6450	4	16	128	533 MHz	136.4 GFLOPS	—N/a	—N/a	64-bit	1 channel 64-bit/channel	LPDDR3-1600 (800 MHz)	12.8 GB/s	2 GB	September 19, 2014
A8X	APL1012	T7001		20 nm Hκ MG	TSMC	3 billion	128 mm^{2}	ARMv8.0-A	64-bit	Typhoon	3	1.5 GHz	—N/a	—N/a	—N/a	3-core	L1i: 64 KB; L1d: 64 KB	2 MB	4 MB (Inclusive)	—N/a	PowerVR; GX6850	8	32	256	450 MHz	230.4 GFLOPS	—N/a	—N/a	128-bit	2 channels 64-bit/channel	LPDDR3-1600 (800 MHz)	25.6 GB/s	2 GB	October 22, 2014
A9	APL0898	S8000		14 nm FinFET	Samsung	≥ 2 billion	96 mm^{2}	ARMv8.0-A	64-bit	Twister	2	1.85 GHz	—N/a	—N/a	—N/a	Dual-core	L1i: 64 KB; L1d: 64 KB	3 MB	4 MB (Victim)	—N/a	PowerVR; GT7600	6	24	192	650 MHz	249.6 GFLOPS	—N/a	—N/a	64-bit	1 channel 64-bit/channel	LPDDR4-3200 (1600 MHz)	25.6 GB/s	2 GB	September 25, 2015
A9	APL1022	S8003		16 nm FinFET	TSMC	≥ 2 billion	104.5 mm^{2}	ARMv8.0-A	64-bit	Twister	2	1.85 GHz	—N/a	—N/a	—N/a	Dual-core	L1i: 64 KB; L1d: 64 KB	3 MB	4 MB (Victim)	—N/a	PowerVR; GT7600	6	24	192	650 MHz	249.6 GFLOPS	—N/a	—N/a	64-bit	1 channel 64-bit/channel	LPDDR4-3200 (1600 MHz)	25.6 GB/s	2 GB	September 25, 2015
A9X	APL1021	S8001		16 nm FinFET	TSMC	≥ 3 billion	143.9 mm^{2}	ARMv8.0-A	64-bit	Twister	2	2.16 GHz	—N/a	—N/a	—N/a	Dual-core	L1i: 64 KB; L1d: 64 KB	3 MB	—N/a	—N/a	PowerVR; GT7850	12	48	384	650 MHz	499.2 GFLOPS	—N/a	—N/a	128-bit (Note: 64-bit due to unused channel)	2 channels (Note: 1 channel unused); 64-bit/channel	LPDDR4-3200 (1600 MHz)	25.6 GB/s	2 GB	November 11, 2015
A9X	APL1021	S8001		16 nm FinFET	TSMC	≥ 3 billion	143.9 mm^{2}	ARMv8.0-A	64-bit	Twister	2	2.26 GHz	—N/a	—N/a	—N/a	Dual-core	L1i: 64 KB; L1d: 64 KB	3 MB	—N/a	—N/a	PowerVR; GT7850	12	48	384	650 MHz	499.2 GFLOPS	—N/a	—N/a	128-bit	2 channels 64-bit/channel	LPDDR4-3200 (1600 MHz)	51.2 GB/s	4 GB	November 11, 2015
A10 Fusion	APL1W24	T8010		16 nm FinFET	TSMC	3.3 billion	125 mm^{2}	ARMv8.1-A	64-bit	Hurricane	2	1.64 GHz	Zephyr	2	1.09 GHz	4-core (Note: Only 2 cores perform at the same time)	P-core: L1i: 64 KB; L1d: 64 KB E-core: L1i: 32 KB; L1d: 32 KB	P-core: 3 MB E-core: 1 MB	4 MB	—N/a	PowerVR; GT7600; Plus	6	24	192	900 MHz	345.6 GFLOPS	—N/a	—N/a	64-bit	1 channel 64-bit/channel	LPDDR4-3200 (1600 MHz)	25.6 GB/s	2 GB	September 16, 2016
A10 Fusion	APL1W24	T8010		16 nm FinFET	TSMC	3.3 billion	125 mm^{2}	ARMv8.1-A	64-bit	Hurricane	2	2.34 GHz	Zephyr	2	1.09 GHz	4-core	P-core: L1i: 64 KB; L1d: 64 KB E-core: L1i: 32 KB; L1d: 32 KB	P-core: 3 MB E-core: 1 MB	4 MB	—N/a	PowerVR; GT7600; Plus	6	24	192	900 MHz	345.6 GFLOPS	—N/a	—N/a	64-bit	1 channel 64-bit/channel	LPDDR4-3200 (1600 MHz)	25.6 GB/s	2 GB	September 16, 2016
A10 Fusion	APL1W24	T8010		16 nm FinFET	TSMC	3.3 billion	125 mm^{2}	ARMv8.1-A	64-bit	Hurricane	2	2.34 GHz	Zephyr	2	1.09 GHz	4-core	P-core: L1i: 64 KB; L1d: 64 KB E-core: L1i: 32 KB; L1d: 32 KB	P-core: 3 MB E-core: 1 MB	4 MB	—N/a	PowerVR; GT7600; Plus	6	24	192	900 MHz	345.6 GFLOPS	—N/a	—N/a	64-bit	1 channel 64-bit/channel	LPDDR4-3200 (1600 MHz)	25.6 GB/s	3 GB	September 16, 2016
A10X Fusion	APL1071	T8011		10 nm FinFET	TSMC	≥ 4 billion	96.4 mm^{2}	ARMv8.1-A	64-bit	Hurricane	3	2.38 GHz	Zephyr	3	1.30 GHz	6-core (Note: Only 3 cores perform at the same time)	P-core: L1i: 64 KB; L1d: 64 KB E-core: L1i: 32 KB; L1d: 32 KB	P-core: 8 MB E-core: 1 MB	—N/a	4 MB	PowerVR; GT7600; Plus	12	48	384	1000 MHz	768.0 GFLOPS	—N/a	—N/a	128-bit	2 channels 64-bit/channel	LPDDR4-3200 (1600 MHz)	51.2 GB/s	3 GB	June 13, 2017
A10X Fusion	APL1071	T8011		10 nm FinFET	TSMC	≥ 4 billion	96.4 mm^{2}	ARMv8.1-A	64-bit	Hurricane	3	2.38 GHz	Zephyr	3	1.30 GHz	6-core	P-core: L1i: 64 KB; L1d: 64 KB E-core: L1i: 32 KB; L1d: 32 KB	P-core: 8 MB E-core: 1 MB	—N/a	4 MB	PowerVR; GT7600; Plus	12	48	384	1000 MHz	768.0 GFLOPS	—N/a	—N/a	128-bit	2 channels 64-bit/channel	LPDDR4-3200 (1600 MHz)	51.2 GB/s	4 GB	June 13, 2017
A11 Bionic	APL1W72	T8015		10 nm FinFET	TSMC	4.3 billion	87.66 mm^{2}	ARMv8.2-A	64-bit	Monsoon	2	2.39 GHz	Mistral	4	1.19 GHz	6-core	P-core: L1i: 64 KB; L1d: 64 KB E-core: L1i: 32 KB; L1d: 32 KB	P-core: 8 MB E-core: 1 MB	—N/a	4 MB	1st generation Apple- designed	3	12	192	1066 MHz	409.3 GFLOPS	2	600 billion OPS	64-bit	4 channels 16-bit/channel	LPDDR4X-4266 (2133 MHz)	34.1 GB/s	2 GB	September 22, 2017
A11 Bionic	APL1W72	T8015		10 nm FinFET	TSMC	4.3 billion	87.66 mm^{2}	ARMv8.2-A	64-bit	Monsoon	2	2.39 GHz	Mistral	4	1.19 GHz	6-core	P-core: L1i: 64 KB; L1d: 64 KB E-core: L1i: 32 KB; L1d: 32 KB	P-core: 8 MB E-core: 1 MB	—N/a	4 MB	1st generation Apple- designed	3	12	192	1066 MHz	409.3 GFLOPS	2	600 billion OPS	64-bit	4 channels 16-bit/channel	LPDDR4X-4266 (2133 MHz)	34.1 GB/s	3 GB	September 22, 2017
A12 Bionic	APL1W81	T8020		7 nm (N7); FinFET	TSMC	6.9 billion	83.27 mm^{2}	ARMv8.3-A	64-bit	Vortex	2	2.49 GHz	Tempest	4	1.59 GHz	6-core	P-core: L1i: 128 KB; L1d: 128 KB E-core: L1i: 32 KB; L1d: 32 KB	P-core: 8 MB E-core: 2 MB	—N/a	8 MB	2nd generation Apple- designed (Apple G11P)	4	16	256	1125 MHz	576.0 GFLOPS	8	5 TOPS	64-bit	4 channels 16-bit/channel	LPDDR4X-4266 (2133 MHz)	34.1 GB/s	3 GB	September 21, 2018
A12 Bionic	APL1W81	T8020		7 nm (N7); FinFET	TSMC	6.9 billion	83.27 mm^{2}	ARMv8.3-A	64-bit	Vortex	2	2.49 GHz	Tempest	4	1.59 GHz	6-core	P-core: L1i: 128 KB; L1d: 128 KB E-core: L1i: 32 KB; L1d: 32 KB	P-core: 8 MB E-core: 2 MB	—N/a	8 MB	2nd generation Apple- designed (Apple G11P)	4	16	256	1125 MHz	576.0 GFLOPS	8	5 TOPS	64-bit	4 channels 16-bit/channel	LPDDR4X-4266 (2133 MHz)	34.1 GB/s	4 GB	September 21, 2018
A12X Bionic	APL1083	T8027		7 nm (N7); FinFET	TSMC	10 billion	135 mm^{2}	ARMv8.3-A	64-bit	Vortex	4	2.49 GHz	Tempest	4	1.59 GHz	8-core	P-core: L1i: 128 KB; L1d: 128 KB E-core: L1i: 32 KB; L1d: 32 KB	P-core: 8 MB E-core: 2 MB	—N/a	8 MB	2nd generation Apple- designed (Apple G11G)	7	28	448	1125 MHz	1.008 TFLOPS	8	5 TOPS	128-bit	2 channels 64-bit/channel	LPDDR4X-4266 (2133 MHz)	68.2 GB/s	4 GB	November 7, 2018
A12X Bionic	APL1083	T8027		7 nm (N7); FinFET	TSMC	10 billion	135 mm^{2}	ARMv8.3-A	64-bit	Vortex	4	2.49 GHz	Tempest	4	1.59 GHz	8-core	P-core: L1i: 128 KB; L1d: 128 KB E-core: L1i: 32 KB; L1d: 32 KB	P-core: 8 MB E-core: 2 MB	—N/a	8 MB	2nd generation Apple- designed (Apple G11G)	7	28	448	1125 MHz	1.008 TFLOPS	8	5 TOPS	128-bit	2 channels 64-bit/channel	LPDDR4X-4266 (2133 MHz)	68.2 GB/s	6 GB	November 7, 2018
A12Z Bionic	APL1083	T8027		7 nm (N7); FinFET	TSMC	10 billion	135 mm^{2}	ARMv8.3-A	64-bit	Vortex	4	2.49 GHz	Tempest	4	1.59 GHz	8-core	P-core: L1i: 128 KB; L1d: 128 KB E-core: L1i: 32 KB; L1d: 32 KB	P-core: 8 MB E-core: 2 MB	—N/a	8 MB	2nd generation Apple- designed (Apple G11G)	8	32	512	1125 MHz	1.152 TFLOPS	8	5 TOPS	128-bit	2 channels 64-bit/channel	LPDDR4X-4266 (2133 MHz)	68.2 GB/s	6 GB	March 25, 2020
A12Z Bionic	APL1083	T8027		7 nm (N7); FinFET	TSMC	10 billion	135 mm^{2}	ARMv8.3-A	64-bit	Vortex	4	2.49 GHz	Tempest	4	1.59 GHz	8-core	P-core: L1i: 128 KB; L1d: 128 KB E-core: L1i: 32 KB; L1d: 32 KB	P-core: 8 MB E-core: 2 MB	—N/a	8 MB	2nd generation Apple- designed (Apple G11G)	8	32	512	1125 MHz	1.152 TFLOPS	8	5 TOPS	128-bit	2 channels 64-bit/channel	LPDDR4X-4266 (2133 MHz)	68.2 GB/s	16 GB	June 22, 2020
A13 Bionic	APL1W85	T8030		7 nm (N7P); FinFET	TSMC	8.5 billion	98.48 mm^{2}	ARMv8.4-A	64-bit	Lightning	2	2.66 GHz	Thunder	4	1.72 GHz	6-core	P-core: L1i: 128 KB; L1d: 128 KB E-core: L1i: 96 KB; L1d: 48 KB	P-core: 8 MB E-core: 4 MB	—N/a	16 MB	3rd generation Apple- designed	4	16	256	1350 MHz	691.2 GFLOPS	8	5.5 TOPS	64-bit	4 channels 16-bit/channel	LPDDR4X-4266 (2133 MHz)	34.1 GB/s	3 GB	September 20, 2019
A13 Bionic	APL1W85	T8030		7 nm (N7P); FinFET	TSMC	8.5 billion	98.48 mm^{2}	ARMv8.4-A	64-bit	Lightning	2	2.66 GHz	Thunder	4	1.72 GHz	6-core	P-core: L1i: 128 KB; L1d: 128 KB E-core: L1i: 96 KB; L1d: 48 KB	P-core: 8 MB E-core: 4 MB	—N/a	16 MB	3rd generation Apple- designed	4	16	256	1350 MHz	691.2 GFLOPS	8	5.5 TOPS	64-bit	4 channels 16-bit/channel	LPDDR4X-4266 (2133 MHz)	34.1 GB/s	4 GB	September 20, 2019
A14 Bionic	APL1W01	T8101		5 nm (N5); FinFET	TSMC	11.8 billion	88 mm^{2}	ARMv8.5-A	64-bit	Firestorm	2	3.00 GHz	Icestorm	4	1.82 GHz	6-core	P-core: L1i: 192 KB; L1d: 128 KB E-core: L1i: 128 KB; L1d: 64 KB	P-core: 8 MB E-core: 4 MB	—N/a	16 MB	4th generation Apple- designed	4	16	256	1462.5 MHz	748.8 GFLOPS	16	11 TOPS	64-bit	4 channels 16-bit/channel	LPDDR4X-4266 (2133 MHz)	34.1 GB/s	4 GB	October 23, 2020
A14 Bionic	APL1W01	T8101		5 nm (N5); FinFET	TSMC	11.8 billion	88 mm^{2}	ARMv8.5-A	64-bit	Firestorm	2	3.00 GHz	Icestorm	4	1.82 GHz	6-core	P-core: L1i: 192 KB; L1d: 128 KB E-core: L1i: 128 KB; L1d: 64 KB	P-core: 8 MB E-core: 4 MB	—N/a	16 MB	4th generation Apple- designed	4	16	256	1462.5 MHz	748.8 GFLOPS	16	11 TOPS	64-bit	4 channels 16-bit/channel	LPDDR4X-4266 (2133 MHz)	34.1 GB/s	4 GB	October 23, 2020
A15 Bionic	APL1W07	T8110		5 nm (N5P); FinFET	TSMC	15 billion	108.01 mm^{2}	ARMv8.6-A	64-bit	Avalanche	2	2.93 GHz	Blizzard	3	2.02 GHz	5-core	P-core: L1i: 192 KB; L1d: 128 KB E-core: L1i: 128 KB; L1d: 64 KB	P-core: 12 MB E-core: 4 MB	—N/a	32 MB	5th generation Apple- designed	5	20	640	1338 MHz	1.713 TFLOPS	16	15.8 TOPS	64-bit	4 channels 16-bit/channel	LPDDR4X-4266 (2133 MHz)	34.1 GB/s	4 GB	November 4, 2022
A15 Bionic	APL1W07	T8110		5 nm (N5P); FinFET	TSMC	15 billion	108.01 mm^{2}	ARMv8.6-A	64-bit	Avalanche	2	3.23 GHz	Blizzard	4	2.02 GHz	6-core	P-core: L1i: 192 KB; L1d: 128 KB E-core: L1i: 128 KB; L1d: 64 KB	P-core: 12 MB E-core: 4 MB	—N/a	32 MB	5th generation Apple- designed	4	16	512	1338 MHz	1.370 TFLOPS	16	15.8 TOPS	64-bit	4 channels 16-bit/channel	LPDDR4X-4266 (2133 MHz)	34.1 GB/s	4 GB	September 24, 2021
A15 Bionic	APL1W07	T8110		5 nm (N5P); FinFET	TSMC	15 billion	108.01 mm^{2}	ARMv8.6-A	64-bit	Avalanche	2	2.93 GHz	Blizzard	4	2.02 GHz	6-core	P-core: L1i: 192 KB; L1d: 128 KB E-core: L1i: 128 KB; L1d: 64 KB	P-core: 12 MB E-core: 4 MB	—N/a	32 MB	5th generation Apple- designed	5	20	640	1338 MHz	1.713 TFLOPS	16	15.8 TOPS	64-bit	4 channels 16-bit/channel	LPDDR4X-4266 (2133 MHz)	34.1 GB/s	4 GB	September 24, 2021
A15 Bionic	APL1W07	T8110		5 nm (N5P); FinFET	TSMC	15 billion	108.01 mm^{2}	ARMv8.6-A	64-bit	Avalanche	2	3.23 GHz	Blizzard	4	2.02 GHz	6-core	P-core: L1i: 192 KB; L1d: 128 KB E-core: L1i: 128 KB; L1d: 64 KB	P-core: 12 MB E-core: 4 MB	—N/a	32 MB	5th generation Apple- designed	5	20	640	1338 MHz	1.713 TFLOPS	16	15.8 TOPS	64-bit	4 channels 16-bit/channel	LPDDR4X-4266 (2133 MHz)	34.1 GB/s	6 GB	September 24, 2021
A16	APL1W10	T8120		4 nm (N4P); FinFET	TSMC	16 billion	112.75 mm^{2}	ARMv8.6-A	64-bit	Everest	2	3.46 GHz	Sawtooth	3	2.02 GHz	5-core	P-core: L1i: 192 KB; L1d: 128 KB E-core: L1i: 128 KB; L1d: 64 KB	P-core: 16 MB E-core: 4 MB	—N/a	24 MB	6th generation Apple- designed	4	16	512	1398 MHz	1.431 TFLOPS	16	17 TOPS	64-bit	4 channels 16-bit/channel	LPDDR5-6400 (3200 MHz)	51.2 GB/s	6 GB	March 12, 2025
A16 Bionic	APL1W10	T8120		4 nm (N4P); FinFET	TSMC	16 billion	112.75 mm^{2}	ARMv8.6-A	64-bit	Everest	2	3.46 GHz	Sawtooth	4	2.02 GHz	6-core	P-core: L1i: 192 KB; L1d: 128 KB E-core: L1i: 128 KB; L1d: 64 KB	P-core: 16 MB E-core: 4 MB	—N/a	24 MB	6th generation Apple- designed	5	20	640	1398 MHz	1.789 TFLOPS	16	17 TOPS	64-bit	4 channels 16-bit/channel	LPDDR5-6400 (3200 MHz)	51.2 GB/s	6 GB	September 16, 2022
A17 Pro	APL1V02	T8130		3 nm (N3B) FinFET	TSMC	19 billion	103.80 mm^{2}	ARMv8.6-A	64-bit	Everest (2nd generation)	2	3.78 GHz	Sawtooth (2nd generation)	4	2.11 GHz	6-core	P-core: L1i: 192 KB; L1d: 128 KB E-core: L1i: 128 KB; L1d: 64 KB	P-core: 16 MB E-core: 4 MB	—N/a	24 MB	7th generation Apple- designed	5	20	640	1398 MHz	1.789 TFLOPS	16	35 TOPS	64-bit	4 channels 16-bit/channel	LPDDR5-6400 (3200 MHz)	51.2 GB/s	8 GB	October 15, 2024
A17 Pro	APL1V02	T8130		3 nm (N3B) FinFET	TSMC	19 billion	103.80 mm^{2}	ARMv8.6-A	64-bit	Everest (2nd generation)	2	3.78 GHz	Sawtooth (2nd generation)	4	2.11 GHz	6-core	P-core: L1i: 192 KB; L1d: 128 KB E-core: L1i: 128 KB; L1d: 64 KB	P-core: 16 MB E-core: 4 MB	—N/a	24 MB	7th generation Apple- designed	6	24	768	1398 MHz	2.147 TFLOPS	16	35 TOPS	64-bit	4 channels 16-bit/channel	LPDDR5-6400 (3200 MHz)	51.2 GB/s	8 GB	September 22, 2023
A18	APL1V08	T8140a		3 nm (N3E) FinFET	TSMC		90 mm^{2}	ARMv9.2-A	64-bit	Everest (3rd generation)	2	4.05 GHz	Sawtooth (3rd generation)	4	2.42 GHz	6-core	P-core: L1i: 192 KB; L1d: 128 KB E-core: L1i: 128 KB; L1d: 64 KB	P-core: 8 MB E-core: 4 MB	—N/a	12 MB	8th generation Apple- designed	4	16	512	1490 MHz	1.526 TFLOPS	16	35 TOPS	64-bit	4 channels 16-bit/channel	LPDDR5X-7500 (3750 MHz)	60.0 GB/s	8 GB	February 28, 2025
A18	APL1V08	T8140a		3 nm (N3E) FinFET	TSMC		90 mm^{2}	ARMv9.2-A	64-bit	Everest (3rd generation)	2	4.05 GHz	Sawtooth (3rd generation)	4	2.42 GHz	6-core	P-core: L1i: 192 KB; L1d: 128 KB E-core: L1i: 128 KB; L1d: 64 KB	P-core: 8 MB E-core: 4 MB	—N/a	12 MB	8th generation Apple- designed	5	20	640	1490 MHz	1.907 TFLOPS	16	35 TOPS	64-bit	4 channels 16-bit/channel	LPDDR5X-7500 (3750 MHz)	60.0 GB/s	8 GB	September 9, 2024
A18 Pro	APL1V07	T8140		3 nm (N3E) FinFET	TSMC		105 mm^{2}	ARMv9.2-A	64-bit	Everest (3rd generation)	2	4.05 GHz	Sawtooth (3rd generation)	4	2.42 GHz	6-core	P-core: L1i: 192 KB; L1d: 128 KB E-core: L1i: 128 KB; L1d: 64 KB	P-core: 16 MB E-core: 4 MB	—N/a	24 MB	8th generation Apple- designed	5	20	640	1490 MHz	1.907 TFLOPS	16	35 TOPS	64-bit	4 channels 16-bit/channel	LPDDR5X-7500 (3750 MHz)	60.0 GB/s	8 GB	March 4, 2026
A18 Pro	APL1V07	T8140		3 nm (N3E) FinFET	TSMC		105 mm^{2}	ARMv9.2-A	64-bit	Everest (3rd generation)	2	4.05 GHz	Sawtooth (3rd generation)	4	2.42 GHz	6-core	P-core: L1i: 192 KB; L1d: 128 KB E-core: L1i: 128 KB; L1d: 64 KB	P-core: 16 MB E-core: 4 MB	—N/a	24 MB	8th generation Apple- designed	6	24	768	1490 MHz	2.289 TFLOPS	16	35 TOPS	64-bit	4 channels 16-bit/channel	LPDDR5X-7500 (3750 MHz)	60.0 GB/s	8 GB	September 9, 2024
A19	APL1V13	T8150		3 nm (N3P) FinFET	TSMC		84.56 mm^{2}	ARMv9.2-A	64-bit		2	4.26 GHz		4	2.6 GHz	6-core	P-core: L1i: 192 KB; L1d: 128 KB E-core: L1i: 128 KB; L1d: 64 KB	P-core: 8 MB E-core: 4 MB	—N/a	12 MB	9th generation Apple- designed	4	16	512	1620 MHz	1.659 TFLOPS	16	35 TOPS	64-bit	4 channels 16-bit/channel	LPDDR5X-8533 (4266 MHz)	68.3 GB/s	8 GB	March 2, 2026
A19	APL1V13	T8150		3 nm (N3P) FinFET	TSMC		84.56 mm^{2}	ARMv9.2-A	64-bit		2	4.26 GHz		4	2.6 GHz	6-core	P-core: L1i: 192 KB; L1d: 128 KB E-core: L1i: 128 KB; L1d: 64 KB	P-core: 8 MB E-core: 4 MB	—N/a	12 MB	9th generation Apple- designed	5	20	640	1620 MHz	2.074 TFLOPS	16	35 TOPS	64-bit	4 channels 16-bit/channel	LPDDR5X-8533 (4266 MHz)	68.3 GB/s	8 GB	September 9, 2025
A19 Pro	APL1V12	T8150		3 nm (N3P) FinFET	TSMC		98.69 mm^{2}	ARMv9.2-A	64-bit		2	4.26 GHz		4	2.6 GHz	6-core	P-core: L1i: 192 KB; L1d: 128 KB E-core: L1i: 128 KB; L1d: 64 KB	P-core: 16 MB E-core: 6 MB	—N/a	32 MB	9th generation Apple- designed	5	20	640	1620 MHz	2.074 TFLOPS	16	35 TOPS	64-bit	4 channels 16-bit/channel	LPDDR5X-8533 (4266 MHz)	68.3 GB/s	12 GB	September 9, 2025
A19 Pro	APL1V12	T8150		3 nm (N3P) FinFET	TSMC		98.69 mm^{2}	ARMv9.2-A	64-bit		2	4.26 GHz		4	2.6 GHz	6-core	P-core: L1i: 192 KB; L1d: 128 KB E-core: L1i: 128 KB; L1d: 64 KB	P-core: 16 MB E-core: 6 MB	—N/a	32 MB	9th generation Apple- designed	6	24	768	1620 MHz	2.488 TFLOPS	16	35 TOPS	64-bit	4 channels 16-bit/channel	LPDDR5X-9600 (4800 MHz)	76.8 GB/s	12 GB	September 9, 2025
A20 Pro	APL1Y01	T8160		2 nm (N2) GAAFET	TSMC		98.8 mm^{2}		64-bit		2	4.93 GHz		4	2.64 GHz	6-core	P-core: L1i: 192 KB; L1d: 128 KB E-core: L1i: 160 KB; L1d: 96 KB	P-core: 16 MB E-core: 8 MB	—N/a	36 MB	10th generation Apple- designed	7	28	896	1620 MHz	2.903 TFLOPS	32		96-bit	3 channels 32-bit/channel	LPDDR5X-9600 (4800 MHz)	115.2 GB/s	12 GB	September 18, 2026

== M-series SoCs ==
The M series is a family of system on a chip (SoC) used in Mac computers from November 2020 and later, iPad Pro tablets from April 2021 and later, iPad Air tablets from March 2022 and later, and Apple Vision Pro. The M designation was previously used for Apple motion coprocessors.

Evolution of Apple M series

M1; November 10, 2020 – May 7, 2024
M1 Pro; October 18, 2021 – January 17, 2023
M1 Max; October 18, 2021 – June 5, 2023
M1 Ultra; March 8, 2022 – June 5, 2023
M2; June 6, 2022 – October 15, 2025
M2 Pro; January 17, 2023 – October 29, 2024
M2 Max; January 17, 2023 – March 4, 2025
M2 Ultra; June 5, 2023 – March 26, 2026
M3; October 30, 2023 – March 2, 2026
M3 Pro; October 30, 2023 – October 30, 2024
M3 Max; October 30, 2023 – October 30, 2024
M3 Ultra; March 12, 2025 – August 25, 2026
M4; May 7, 2024 – present
M4 Pro; October 29, 2024 – August 25, 2026
M4 Max; October 30, 2024 – August 25, 2026
M5; October 15, 2025 – present
M5 Pro; March 11, 2026 – present
M5 Max; March 11, 2026 – present
M5 Ultra; September 22, 2026 – present
M6; September 22, 2026 – present

=== Apple M1 ===
The M1, Apple's first system on a chip designed for use in Macs, is manufactured using TSMC's 5 nm process. Announced on November 10, 2020, it was first used in the MacBook Air, Mac mini and 13-inch MacBook Pro, and later used in the iMac, 5th-generation iPad Pro and 5th-generation iPad Air. It comes with 4 performance cores and 4 efficiency cores, for a total of 8 CPU cores. It comes with up to 8 GPU cores, with the entry level MacBook Air having only 7 GPU cores. The M1 has 16 billion transistors and operates at a clock frequency of up to 3.2 GHz.

==== Apple M1 Pro ====
The M1 Pro is a more powerful version of the M1, with six to eight performance cores, two efficiency cores, 14 to 16 GPU cores, 16 Neural Engine cores, up to 32 GB unified RAM with up to 200 GB/s memory bandwidth, and more than double the transistors. It was announced on October 18, 2021, and is used in the 14- and 16-inch MacBook Pro. Apple claimed the CPU performance is about 70% faster than the M1, and that its GPU performance is about double. Apple claims the M1 Pro can deliver up to 20 streams of 4K or 7 streams of 8K ProRes video playback. Like the M1, the M1 Pro operates at a clock frequency of up to 3.2 GHz.

==== Apple M1 Max ====
The M1 Max is a larger version of the M1 Pro chip, with eight performance cores, two efficiency cores, 24 to 32 GPU cores, 16 Neural Engine cores, up to 64 GB unified RAM with up to 400 GB/s memory bandwidth, and more than double the number of transistors. It was announced on October 18, 2021, and is used in the 14- and 16-inch MacBook Pro, as well as the Mac Studio. Apple claims the M1 Max can deliver up to 30 streams of 4K or 7 streams of 8K ProRes video playback, more than the 2019 Mac Pro with the Afterburner card. Like the M1, the M1 Max operates at a clock frequency of up to 3.2 GHz.

==== Apple M1 Ultra ====
The M1 Ultra consists of two M1 Max dies connected together by a silicon interposer through Apple's UltraFusion interconnect. It has 114 billion transistors, 16 performance cores, 4 efficiency cores, 48 to 64 GPU cores and 32 Neural Engine cores; it can be configured with up to 128 GB unified RAM of 800 GB/s memory bandwidth. It was announced on March 8, 2022, as an optional upgrade for the Mac Studio. Apple claims the M1 Ultra can deliver up to 18 streams of 8K ProRes video playback. Like the M1 Max, the M1 Ultra operates at a clock frequency of up to 3.2 GHz.

=== Apple M2 ===
Apple announced the M2 SoC on June 6, 2022, at WWDC, along with a redesigned MacBook Air and a revised 13-inch MacBook Pro. It later appeared in the sixth-generation iPad Pro, Mac mini, iPad Air and Vision Pro. The M2 is made with TSMC's "enhanced 5-nanometer technology" N5P process and contains 20 billion transistors, a 25% increase from the previous generation M1, also operating at a higher clock frequency of up to about 3.5 GHz. The M2 can be configured with up to 24 gigabytes of RAM and 2 terabytes of storage. It has 8 CPU cores (4 performance and 4 efficiency) and up to 10 GPU cores. The M2 also increases the memory bandwidth to 100 GB/s. Apple claims CPU improvements up to 18% and GPU improvements up to 35% compared to the previous M1.

==== Apple M2 Pro ====
The M2 Pro is a more powerful version of the M2, with six to eight performance cores, four efficiency cores, 16 to 19 GPU cores, 16 Neural Engine cores, up to 32 GB unified RAM with up to 200 GB/s memory bandwidth, and double the transistors. It was announced on January 17, 2023, in a press release and is used in the 14- and 16-inch MacBook Pro as well as the Mac Mini. Apple claims the CPU performance is 20 percent faster than the M1 Pro and the GPU is 30 percent faster than the M1 Pro. Like the M2, the M2 Pro operates at a clock frequency of up to about 3.5 GHz.

==== Apple M2 Max ====
The M2 Max is a larger version of the M2 Pro, with eight performance cores, four efficiency cores, 30 to 38 GPU cores, 16 Neural Engine cores, up to 96 GB unified RAM with up to 400 GB/s memory bandwidth, and more than double the transistors. It was announced on January 17, 2023, in a press release and is used in the 14- and 16-inch MacBook Pro, as well as the Mac Studio. Apple claims the CPU performance is 20 percent faster than M1 Max and the GPU is 30 percent faster than the M1 Max. Unlike the M2 and the M2 Pro, the M2 Max operates at a clock frequency of up to about 3.6 GHz.

==== Apple M2 Ultra ====
The M2 Ultra consists of two M2 Max dies connected together by a silicon interposer through Apple's UltraFusion interconnect. It has 134 billion transistors, 16 performance cores, 8 efficiency cores, 60 to 76 GPU cores and 32 Neural Engine cores; it can be configured with up to 192 GB unified RAM of 800 GB/s memory bandwidth. It was announced on June 5, 2023, as an optional upgrade for the Mac Studio and the sole processor for the Mac Pro. Apple claims the M2 Ultra can deliver up to 22 streams of 8K ProRes video playback. Like the M2 Max, the M2 Ultra operates at a clock frequency of up to about 3.6 GHz.

=== Apple M3 ===
Apple announced the M3 series on October 30, 2023, along with the new 14-inch MacBook Pro and iMac; the M3 was later used in the MacBook Air and the iPad Air. The M3 is based on the 3 nm process and contains 25 billion transistors, a 25% increase from the previous M2 generation, and operates at a clock frequency of up to 4.1 GHz. It has 8 CPU cores (4 performance cores and 4 efficiency cores) and up to 10 GPU cores. Apple claims CPU improvements up to 35% and GPU improvements up to 65% compared to the M1 series. The M3 series introduced hardware-accelerated ray tracing and mesh shading for the first time in a Mac.

==== Apple M3 Pro ====
The M3 Pro is a more powerful version of the M3, with five or six performance cores, six efficiency cores, 14 to 18 GPU cores, 16 Neural Engine cores, up to 36 GB unified RAM with 150 GB/s memory bandwidth, and 48% more transistors. It is used in the 14- and 16-inch MacBook Pro and operates at a clock frequency of up to about 4.1 GHz. Apple claims the CPU performance is 30 percent faster than the M1 Pro and the GPU is 40 percent faster than the M1 Pro.

==== Apple M3 Max ====
The M3 Max is a larger version of the M3 Pro, with ten or twelve performance cores, four efficiency cores, 30 to 40 GPU cores, 16 Neural Engine cores, up to 128 GB unified RAM with up to 400 GB/s memory bandwidth, and more than double the transistors. It is used in the 14- and 16-inch MacBook Pro. Apple claims the CPU performance is 80 percent faster than the M1 Max and the GPU is 50 percent faster than the M1 Max. Like the M3 and the M3 Pro, the M3 Max operates at a clock frequency of up to about 4.1 GHz.

==== Apple M3 Ultra ====
The M3 Ultra consists of two M3 Max dies connected together by a silicon interposer through Apple's UltraFusion interconnect. It has 184 billion transistors, 20 or 24 performance cores, 8 efficiency cores, 60 to 80 GPU cores and 32 Neural Engine cores; it can be configured with up to 512 GB unified RAM of 800 GB/s memory bandwidth. It was announced on March 5, 2025, as an optional upgrade for the Mac Studio, and operates at a clock frequency of up to about 4.0 GHz unlike the M3 Max. Apple claims the M3 Ultra can deliver up to 24 streams of 8K ProRes video playback.

=== Apple M4 ===
Apple announced the M4 chip on May 7, 2024, along with the new iPad Pro; it was later used for the iMac, Mac mini, 14-inch MacBook Pro, MacBook Air and iPad Air. The M4 is based on TSMC's 3nm technology using the N3E process node. It has up to 10 CPU cores (3 or 4 performance and 4 to 6 efficiency) and up to 10 GPU cores. Apple claims the M4 has up to 1.5x faster CPU performance compared to the M2. The M4 operates at a clock frequency of 4.4 GHz.

The M4 is the first Apple silicon chip to use the ARMv9.2-A instruction set without SVE2.

==== Apple M4 Pro ====
The M4 Pro is a more powerful version of the M4, with eight or ten performance cores, four efficiency cores, 16 to 20 GPU cores, 16 Neural Engine cores, and up to 64 GB unified RAM with 273 GB/s memory bandwidth. It is used in the 14- and 16-inch MacBook Pro as well as the Mac Mini. Apple claims the CPU performance is 1.9x faster than the M1 Pro and the GPU is 2x faster than the M1 Pro. The M4 Pro operates at a clock frequency of 4.5 GHz.

==== Apple M4 Max ====
The M4 Max is a larger version of the M4 Pro, with ten or twelve performance cores, four efficiency cores, 32 to 40 GPU cores, 16 Neural Engine cores, and up to 128 GB unified RAM with up to 546 GB/s memory bandwidth. It is used in the 14- and 16-inch MacBook Pro as well as the Mac Studio. Apple claims the CPU performance is 2.2x faster than the M1 Max and the GPU is 1.9x faster than the M1 Max. The M4 Max operates at a clock frequency of 4.5 GHz.

=== Apple M5 ===
Apple announced the M5 chip on October 15, 2025, along with the new iPad Pro, 14-inch MacBook Pro and Vision Pro; it was later used for the MacBook Air. The M5 is based on TSMC's 3nm technology using the N3P process node, over the M4's N3E process node. It has up to 4 super (Note: The "super" core nomenclature wasn't initially used for the M5, early documentation called these "super" cores "performance" cores. They are not to be confused with the M5 Pro/Max/Ultra "performance" cores, which act as mid-speed cores between super cores and efficiency cores) cores, 6 efficiency cores, and up to 10 GPU cores. The Apple M5 has a clock frequency of 4.61 GHz on the 14-inch MacBook Pro, and 4.4 GHz on the iPad Pro.

==== Apple M5 Pro ====
The M5 Pro is a more powerful version of the M5. It has up to 6 super cores, up to 12 performance cores, up to 20 GPU cores, and 16 Neural Engine cores. The M5 Pro supports up to 64 GB unified RAM with 307 GB/s memory bandwidth. It is used in the 14- and 16-inch MacBook Pro, as well as the Mac Mini. Apple claims the CPU performance is 2.5x faster than the M1 Pro and the GPU is 2.2x faster than the M1 Pro. The M5 Pro operates at a clock frequency of about 4.61 GHz.

==== Apple M5 Max ====
The M5 Max is a larger version of the M5 Pro, with 6 super cores, 12 performance cores, up to 40 GPU cores, and 16 Neural Engine cores. The M5 Max supports up to 128 GB unified RAM with up to 614 GB/s memory bandwidth. It is used in the 14- and 16-inch MacBook Pro, as well as the Mac Studio. Apple claims the CPU performance is 2.5x faster than the M1 Max and the GPU is 2.2x faster than the M1 Max. The M5 Max operates at a clock frequency of about 4.61 GHz, matching the M5 Pro.

==== Apple M5 Ultra ====
The M5 Ultra consists of two M5 Max dies connected together by a silicon interposer through Apple's UltraFusion interconnect. It has 10 or 12 super cores, 20 or 24 performance cores, 64 to 80 GPU cores and 32 Neural Engine cores; it can be configured with up to 512 GB unified RAM of 1.2 TB/s memory bandwidth. It was announced on August 25, 2026, as an optional upgrade for the Mac Studio.

=== Apple M6 ===
Apple announced the M6 chip on August 25, 2026, along with the new Mac Mini; it was later used for the 14-inch MacBook Pro and iMac. The M6 is based on TSMC's 2nm technology using the N2 process node. It has 2 super cores, up to 4 performance cores, up to 6 efficiency cores, and up to 12 GPU cores. It is the first M-series processor to include a dual 16-core Neural Engine.

=== Comparison of M-series processors ===
General			Semiconductor technology				CPU														GPU						AI accelerator		Media Engine					Memory technology					First release
Name	Codename and part no.	Image	Process	Transistor count	Die size	Transistor density	CPU ISA	Super core			Performance core			Efficiency core			Overall cores	Cache			Cores	SIMD EU count	FP32 ALU count	Frequency	FP32 FLOPS (TFLOPS)	Hardware-accelerated ray tracing	Cores	OPS	Hardware Acceleration	Media Decode/Encode Engine				Memory bus width	Total channel Bit per channel	Memory type	Theoretical bandwidth	Available capacity	First release
Name	Codename and part no.	Image	Process	Transistor count	Die size	Transistor density	CPU ISA	Core name	Cores	Core speed	Core name	Cores	Core speed	Core name	Cores	Core speed	Overall cores	L1	L2	SLC	Cores	SIMD EU count	FP32 ALU count	Frequency	FP32 FLOPS (TFLOPS)	Hardware-accelerated ray tracing	Cores	OPS	Hardware Acceleration	Video decode	Video encode	ProRes ecode & encode	AV1 decode	Memory bus width	Total channel Bit per channel	Memory type	Theoretical bandwidth	Available capacity	First release
M1	APL1102; T8103	Apple M1 processor	TSMC; N5	16 billion	118.91 mm^{2}	~134 MTr/mm^{2}	ARMv8.5-A	—N/a			Firestorm	4	3.20 GHz	Icestorm	4	2.06 GHz	8-core	P-core: L1i: 192 KB; L1d: 128 KB E-core: L1i: 128 KB; L1d: 64 KB	P-core: 12 MB E-core: 4 MB	8 MB	7	28	896	1278 MHz	2.290	No	16	11 TOPS	H.264, HEVC	1	1	—N/a	—N/a	128-bit	8 channels 16-bit/channel	LPDDR4X-4266 (2133 MHz)	68.25 GB/s	8 GB; 16 GB	November 17, 2020
M1	APL1102; T8103	Apple M1 processor	TSMC; N5	16 billion	118.91 mm^{2}	~134 MTr/mm^{2}	ARMv8.5-A	—N/a			Firestorm	4	3.20 GHz	Icestorm	4	2.06 GHz	8-core	P-core: L1i: 192 KB; L1d: 128 KB E-core: L1i: 128 KB; L1d: 64 KB	P-core: 12 MB E-core: 4 MB	8 MB	8	32	1024	1278 MHz	2.617	No	16	11 TOPS	H.264, HEVC	1	1	—N/a	—N/a	128-bit	8 channels 16-bit/channel	LPDDR4X-4266 (2133 MHz)	68.25 GB/s	8 GB; 16 GB	November 17, 2020
M1 Pro	APL1103; T6000	Apple M1 Pro processor	TSMC; N5	33.7 billion	≈ 245 mm^{2}	~137 MTr/mm^{2}	ARMv8.5-A	—N/a			Firestorm	6	3.23 GHz	Icestorm	2	2.06 GHz	8-core	P-core: L1i: 192 KB; L1d: 128 KB E-core: L1i: 128 KB; L1d: 64 KB	P-core: 24 MB E-core: 4 MB	24 MB	14	56	1792	1296 MHz	4.644	No	16	11 TOPS	H.264, HEVC, ProRes, ProRes RAW	1	1	1	—N/a	256-bit	8 channels 32-bit/channel	LPDDR5-6400 (3200 MHz)	204.8 GB/s	16 GB; 32 GB	October 26, 2021
M1 Pro	APL1103; T6000	Apple M1 Pro processor	TSMC; N5	33.7 billion	≈ 245 mm^{2}	~137 MTr/mm^{2}	ARMv8.5-A	—N/a			Firestorm	8	3.23 GHz	Icestorm	2	2.06 GHz	10-core	P-core: L1i: 192 KB; L1d: 128 KB E-core: L1i: 128 KB; L1d: 64 KB	P-core: 24 MB E-core: 4 MB	24 MB	14	56	1792	1296 MHz	4.644	No	16	11 TOPS	H.264, HEVC, ProRes, ProRes RAW	1	1	1	—N/a	256-bit	8 channels 32-bit/channel	LPDDR5-6400 (3200 MHz)	204.8 GB/s	16 GB; 32 GB	October 26, 2021
M1 Pro	APL1103; T6000	Apple M1 Pro processor	TSMC; N5	33.7 billion	≈ 245 mm^{2}	~137 MTr/mm^{2}	ARMv8.5-A	—N/a			Firestorm	8	3.23 GHz	Icestorm	2	2.06 GHz	10-core	P-core: L1i: 192 KB; L1d: 128 KB E-core: L1i: 128 KB; L1d: 64 KB	P-core: 24 MB E-core: 4 MB	24 MB	16	64	2048	1296 MHz	5.308	No	16	11 TOPS	H.264, HEVC, ProRes, ProRes RAW	1	1	1	—N/a	256-bit	8 channels 32-bit/channel	LPDDR5-6400 (3200 MHz)	204.8 GB/s	16 GB; 32 GB	October 26, 2021
M1 Max	APL1105; T6001	Apple M1 Max processor	TSMC; N5	57 billion	≈ 432 mm^{2}	~132 MTr/mm^{2}	ARMv8.5-A	—N/a			Firestorm	8	3.23 GHz	Icestorm	2	2.06 GHz	10-core	P-core: L1i: 192 KB; L1d: 128 KB E-core: L1i: 128 KB; L1d: 64 KB	P-core: 24 MB E-core: 4 MB	48 MB	24	96	3072	1296 MHz	7.962	No	16	11 TOPS	H.264, HEVC, ProRes, ProRes RAW	1	2	2	—N/a	512-bit	16 channels 32-bit/channel	LPDDR5-6400 (3200 MHz)	409.6 GB/s	32 GB; 64 GB	October 26, 2021
M1 Max	APL1105; T6001	Apple M1 Max processor	TSMC; N5	57 billion	≈ 432 mm^{2}	~132 MTr/mm^{2}	ARMv8.5-A	—N/a			Firestorm	8	3.23 GHz	Icestorm	2	2.06 GHz	10-core	P-core: L1i: 192 KB; L1d: 128 KB E-core: L1i: 128 KB; L1d: 64 KB	P-core: 24 MB E-core: 4 MB	48 MB	32	128	4096	1296 MHz	10.616	No	16	11 TOPS	H.264, HEVC, ProRes, ProRes RAW	1	2	2	—N/a	512-bit	16 channels 32-bit/channel	LPDDR5-6400 (3200 MHz)	409.6 GB/s	32 GB; 64 GB	October 26, 2021
M1 Ultra	APL1W06; T6002	Apple M1 Ultra processor	TSMC; N5	114 billion	≈ 864 mm^{2}	~132 MTr/mm^{2}	ARMv8.5-A	—N/a			Firestorm	16	3.23 GHz	Icestorm	4	2.06 GHz	20-core	P-core: L1i: 192 KB; L1d: 128 KB E-core: L1i: 128 KB; L1d: 64 KB	P-core: 48 MB E-core: 8 MB	96 MB	48	192	6144	1296 MHz	15.925	No	32	22 TOPS	H.264, HEVC, ProRes, ProRes RAW	2	4	4	—N/a	1024-bit	32 channels 32-bit/channel	LPDDR5-6400 (3200 MHz)	819.2 GB/s	64 GB; 128 GB	March 18, 2022
M1 Ultra	APL1W06; T6002	Apple M1 Ultra processor	TSMC; N5	114 billion	≈ 864 mm^{2}	~132 MTr/mm^{2}	ARMv8.5-A	—N/a			Firestorm	16	3.23 GHz	Icestorm	4	2.06 GHz	20-core	P-core: L1i: 192 KB; L1d: 128 KB E-core: L1i: 128 KB; L1d: 64 KB	P-core: 48 MB E-core: 8 MB	96 MB	64	256	8192	1296 MHz	21.233	No	32	22 TOPS	H.264, HEVC, ProRes, ProRes RAW	2	4	4	—N/a	1024-bit	32 channels 32-bit/channel	LPDDR5-6400 (3200 MHz)	819.2 GB/s	64 GB; 128 GB	March 18, 2022
M2	APL1109; T8112	Apple M2 processor	TSMC; N5P	20 billion	155.25 mm^{2}	~129 MTr/mm^{2}	ARMv8.6-A	—N/a			Avalanche	4	3.49 GHz	Blizzard	4	2.42 GHz	8-core	P-core: L1i: 192 KB; L1d: 128 KB E-core: L1i: 128 KB; L1d: 64 KB	P-core: 16 MB E-core: 4 MB	8 MB	8	32	1024	1398 MHz	2.863	No	16	15.8 TOPS	H.264, HEVC, ProRes, ProRes RAW	1	1	1	—N/a	128-bit	8 channels 16-bit/channel	LPDDR5-6400 (3200 MHz)	102.4 GB/s	8 GB; 16 GB; 24 GB	June 24, 2022
M2	APL1109; T8112	Apple M2 processor	TSMC; N5P	20 billion	155.25 mm^{2}	~129 MTr/mm^{2}	ARMv8.6-A	—N/a			Avalanche	4	3.49 GHz	Blizzard	4	2.42 GHz	8-core	P-core: L1i: 192 KB; L1d: 128 KB E-core: L1i: 128 KB; L1d: 64 KB	P-core: 16 MB E-core: 4 MB	8 MB	9	36	1152	1398 MHz	3.220	No	16	15.8 TOPS	H.264, HEVC	1	1	—N/a	—N/a	128-bit	8 channels 16-bit/channel	LPDDR5-6400 (3200 MHz)	102.4 GB/s	8 GB	May 15, 2024
M2	APL1109; T8112	Apple M2 processor	TSMC; N5P	20 billion	155.25 mm^{2}	~129 MTr/mm^{2}	ARMv8.6-A	—N/a			Avalanche	4	3.49 GHz	Blizzard	4	2.42 GHz	8-core	P-core: L1i: 192 KB; L1d: 128 KB E-core: L1i: 128 KB; L1d: 64 KB	P-core: 16 MB E-core: 4 MB	8 MB	10	40	1280	1398 MHz	3.578	No	16	15.8 TOPS	H.264, HEVC, ProRes, ProRes RAW	1	1	1	—N/a	128-bit	8 channels 16-bit/channel	LPDDR5-6400 (3200 MHz)	102.4 GB/s	8 GB; 16 GB; 24 GB	June 24, 2022
M2 Pro	APL1113; T6020		TSMC; N5P	40 billion	~289 mm^{2}	~138 MTr/mm^{2}	ARMv8.6-A	—N/a			Avalanche	6	3.49 GHz	Blizzard	4	2.42 GHz	10-core	P-core: L1i: 192 KB; L1d: 128 KB E-core: L1i: 128 KB; L1d: 64 KB	P-core: 32 MB E-core: 4 MB	24 MB	16	64	2048	1398 MHz	5.726	No	16	15.8 TOPS	H.264, HEVC, ProRes, ProRes RAW	1	1	1	—N/a	256-bit	8 channels 32-bit/channel	LPDDR5-6400 (3200 MHz)	204.8 GB/s	16 GB; 32 GB	January 24, 2023
M2 Pro	APL1113; T6020		TSMC; N5P	40 billion	~289 mm^{2}	~138 MTr/mm^{2}	ARMv8.6-A	—N/a			Avalanche	8	3.49 GHz	Blizzard	4	2.42 GHz	12-core	P-core: L1i: 192 KB; L1d: 128 KB E-core: L1i: 128 KB; L1d: 64 KB	P-core: 32 MB E-core: 4 MB	24 MB	19	76	2432	1398 MHz	6.799	No	16	15.8 TOPS	H.264, HEVC, ProRes, ProRes RAW	1	1	1	—N/a	256-bit	8 channels 32-bit/channel	LPDDR5-6400 (3200 MHz)	204.8 GB/s	16 GB; 32 GB	January 24, 2023
M2 Max	APL1111; T6021		TSMC; N5P	67 billion			ARMv8.6-A	—N/a			Avalanche	8	3.69 GHz	Blizzard	4	2.42 GHz	12-core	P-core: L1i: 192 KB; L1d: 128 KB E-core: L1i: 128 KB; L1d: 64 KB	P-core: 32 MB E-core: 4 MB	48 MB	30	120	3840	1398 MHz	10.736	No	16	15.8 TOPS	H.264, HEVC, ProRes, ProRes RAW	1	2	2	—N/a	512-bit	16 channels 32-bit/channel	LPDDR5-6400 (3200 MHz)	409.6 GB/s	32 GB; 64 GB; 96 GB	January 24, 2023
M2 Max	APL1111; T6021		TSMC; N5P	67 billion			ARMv8.6-A	—N/a			Avalanche	8	3.69 GHz	Blizzard	4	2.42 GHz	12-core	P-core: L1i: 192 KB; L1d: 128 KB E-core: L1i: 128 KB; L1d: 64 KB	P-core: 32 MB E-core: 4 MB	48 MB	38	152	4864	1398 MHz	13.599	No	16	15.8 TOPS	H.264, HEVC, ProRes, ProRes RAW	1	2	2	—N/a	512-bit	16 channels 32-bit/channel	LPDDR5-6400 (3200 MHz)	409.6 GB/s	32 GB; 64 GB; 96 GB	January 24, 2023
M2 Ultra	APL1W12; T6022		TSMC; N5P	134 billion			ARMv8.6-A	—N/a			Avalanche	16	~3.70 GHz	Blizzard	8	2.42 GHz	24-core	P-core: L1i: 192 KB; L1d: 128 KB E-core: L1i: 128 KB; L1d: 64 KB	P-core: 64 MB E-core: 8 MB	96 MB	60	240	7680	1398 MHz	21.473	No	32	31.6 TOPS	H.264, HEVC, ProRes, ProRes RAW	2	4	4	—N/a	1024-bit	32 channels 32-bit/channel	LPDDR5-6400 (3200 MHz)	819.2 GB/s	64 GB; 128 GB; 192 GB	June 13, 2023
M2 Ultra	APL1W12; T6022		TSMC; N5P	134 billion			ARMv8.6-A	—N/a			Avalanche	16	~3.70 GHz	Blizzard	8	2.42 GHz	24-core	P-core: L1i: 192 KB; L1d: 128 KB E-core: L1i: 128 KB; L1d: 64 KB	P-core: 64 MB E-core: 8 MB	96 MB	76	304	9728	1398 MHz	27.199	No	32	31.6 TOPS	H.264, HEVC, ProRes, ProRes RAW	2	4	4	—N/a	1024-bit	32 channels 32-bit/channel	LPDDR5-6400 (3200 MHz)	819.2 GB/s	64 GB; 128 GB; 192 GB	June 13, 2023
M3	APL1201; T8122		TSMC; N3B	25 billion	152.53 mm^{2}	~164 MTr/mm^{2}	ARMv8.6-A	—N/a			—N/a	4	4.05 GHz	—N/a	4	2.75 GHz	8-core	P-core: L1i: 192 KB; L1d: 128 KB E-core: L1i: 128 KB; L1d: 64 KB	P-core: 16 MB E-core: 4 MB	8 MB	8	128	1024	1380 MHz	2.826	Yes	16	18 TOPS	H.264, HEVC, ProRes, ProRes RAW	1	1	1	1	128-bit	8 channels 16-bit/channel	LPDDR5-6400 (3200 MHz)	102.4 GB/s	8 GB; 16 GB; 24 GB	November 7, 2023
M3	APL1201; T8122		TSMC; N3B	25 billion	152.53 mm^{2}	~164 MTr/mm^{2}	ARMv8.6-A	—N/a			—N/a	4	4.05 GHz	—N/a	4	2.75 GHz	8-core	P-core: L1i: 192 KB; L1d: 128 KB E-core: L1i: 128 KB; L1d: 64 KB	P-core: 16 MB E-core: 4 MB	8 MB	9	144	1152	1380 MHz	3.179	Yes	16	18 TOPS	H.264, HEVC, ProRes, ProRes RAW	1	1	1	1	128-bit	8 channels 16-bit/channel	LPDDR5-6400 (3200 MHz)	102.4 GB/s	8 GB	March 12, 2025
M3	APL1201; T8122		TSMC; N3B	25 billion	152.53 mm^{2}	~164 MTr/mm^{2}	ARMv8.6-A	—N/a			—N/a	4	4.05 GHz	—N/a	4	2.75 GHz	8-core	P-core: L1i: 192 KB; L1d: 128 KB E-core: L1i: 128 KB; L1d: 64 KB	P-core: 16 MB E-core: 4 MB	8 MB	10	160	1280	1380 MHz	3.533	Yes	16	18 TOPS	H.264, HEVC, ProRes, ProRes RAW	1	1	1	1	128-bit	8 channels 16-bit/channel	LPDDR5-6400 (3200 MHz)	102.4 GB/s	8 GB; 16 GB; 24 GB	November 7, 2023
M3 Pro	APL1203; T6030		TSMC; N3B	37 billion	219.22 mm^{2}	~168 MTr/mm^{2}	ARMv8.6-A	—N/a			—N/a	5	4.05 GHz	—N/a	6	2.75 GHz	11-core	P-core: L1i: 192 KB; L1d: 128 KB E-core: L1i: 128 KB; L1d: 64 KB	P-core: 16 MB E-core: 4 MB	12 MB	14	224	1792	1380 MHz	4.946	Yes	16	18 TOPS	H.264, HEVC, ProRes, ProRes RAW	1	1	1	1	192-bit	12 channels 16-bit/channel	LPDDR5-6400 (3200 MHz)	153.6 GB/s	18 GB; 36 GB	November 7, 2023
M3 Pro	APL1203; T6030		TSMC; N3B	37 billion	219.22 mm^{2}	~168 MTr/mm^{2}	ARMv8.6-A	—N/a			—N/a	6	4.05 GHz	—N/a	6	2.75 GHz	12-core	P-core: L1i: 192 KB; L1d: 128 KB E-core: L1i: 128 KB; L1d: 64 KB	P-core: 16 MB E-core: 4 MB	12 MB	18	288	2304	1380 MHz	6.359	Yes	16	18 TOPS	H.264, HEVC, ProRes, ProRes RAW	1	1	1	1	192-bit	12 channels 16-bit/channel	LPDDR5-6400 (3200 MHz)	153.6 GB/s	18 GB; 36 GB	November 7, 2023
M3 Max	APL1204; T6034		TSMC; N3B	92 billion			ARMv8.6-A	—N/a			—N/a	10	4.05 GHz	—N/a	4	2.75 GHz	14-core	P-core: L1i: 192 KB; L1d: 128 KB E-core: L1i: 128 KB; L1d: 64 KB	P-core: 32 MB E-core: 4 MB	48 MB	30	480	3840	1380 MHz	10.598	Yes	16	18 TOPS	H.264, HEVC, ProRes, ProRes RAW	1	2	2	1	384-bit	12 channels 32-bit/channel	LPDDR5-6400 (3200 MHz)	307.2 GB/s	36 GB; 96 GB	November 7, 2023
M3 Max	APL1204; T6031		TSMC; N3B	92 billion			ARMv8.6-A	—N/a			—N/a	12	4.05 GHz	—N/a	4	2.75 GHz	16-core	P-core: L1i: 192 KB; L1d: 128 KB E-core: L1i: 128 KB; L1d: 64 KB	P-core: 32 MB E-core: 4 MB	48 MB	40	640	5120	1380 MHz	14.131	Yes	16	18 TOPS	H.264, HEVC, ProRes, ProRes RAW	1	2	2	1	512-bit	16 channels 32-bit/channel	LPDDR5-6400 (3200 MHz)	409.6 GB/s	48 GB; 64 GB; 128 GB	November 7, 2023
M3 Ultra	T6032		TSMC; N3B	184 billion			ARMv8.6-A	—N/a			—N/a	20	4.05 GHz	—N/a	8	2.75 GHz	28-core	P-core: L1i: 192 KB; L1d: 128 KB E-core: L1i: 128 KB; L1d: 64 KB	P-core: 64 MB E-core: 8 MB	96 MB	60	960	7680	1380 MHz	21.197	Yes	32	36 TOPS	H.264, HEVC, ProRes, ProRes RAW	2	4	4	1	1024-bit	32 channels 32-bit/channel	LPDDR5-6400 (3200 MHz)	819.2 GB/s	96 GB; 256 GB	March 12, 2025
M3 Ultra	T6032		TSMC; N3B	184 billion			ARMv8.6-A	—N/a			—N/a	24	4.05 GHz	—N/a	8	2.75 GHz	32-core	P-core: L1i: 192 KB; L1d: 128 KB E-core: L1i: 128 KB; L1d: 64 KB	P-core: 64 MB E-core: 8 MB	96 MB	80	1280	10240	1380 MHz	28.262	Yes	32	36 TOPS	H.264, HEVC, ProRes, ProRes RAW	2	4	4	1	1024-bit	32 channels 32-bit/channel	LPDDR5-6400 (3200 MHz)	819.2 GB/s	96 GB; 256 GB; 512 GB	March 12, 2025
M4	APL1206; T8132		TSMC; N3E	28 billion	169.35 mm^{2}	~165 MTr/mm^{2}	ARMv9.2-A	—N/a			—N/a	4	4.4 GHz	—N/a	4	2.85 GHz	8-core	P-core: L1i: 192 KB; L1d: 128 KB E-core: L1i: 128 KB; L1d: 64 KB	P-core: 16 MB E-core: 4 MB	8 MB	8	128	1024	1470 MHz	3.01	Yes	16	38 TOPS	H.264, HEVC, ProRes, ProRes RAW	1	1	1	1	128-bit	8 channels 16-bit/channel	LPDDR5X-7500 (3750 MHz)	120 GB/s	16 GB; 24 GB	November 8, 2024
M4	APL1206; T8132		TSMC; N3E	28 billion	169.35 mm^{2}	~165 MTr/mm^{2}	ARMv9.2-A	—N/a			—N/a	3	4.1 GHz	—N/a	5	2.85 GHz	8-core	P-core: L1i: 192 KB; L1d: 128 KB E-core: L1i: 128 KB; L1d: 64 KB	P-core: 16 MB E-core: 4 MB	8 MB	9	144	1152	1470 MHz	3.39	Yes	16	38 TOPS	H.264, HEVC, ProRes, ProRes RAW	1	1	1	1	128-bit	8 channels 16-bit/channel	LPDDR5X-7500 (3750 MHz)	120 GB/s	12 GB	March 11, 2026
M4	APL1206; T8132		TSMC; N3E	28 billion	169.35 mm^{2}	~165 MTr/mm^{2}	ARMv9.2-A	—N/a			—N/a	3	4.4 GHz	—N/a	6	2.85 GHz	9-core	P-core: L1i: 192 KB; L1d: 128 KB E-core: L1i: 128 KB; L1d: 64 KB	P-core: 16 MB E-core: 4 MB	8 MB	10	160	1280	1470 MHz	3.76	Yes	16	38 TOPS	H.264, HEVC, ProRes, ProRes RAW	1	1	1	1	128-bit	8 channels 16-bit/channel	LPDDR5X-7500 (3750 MHz)	120 GB/s	8 GB	May 15, 2024
M4	APL1206; T8132		TSMC; N3E	28 billion	169.35 mm^{2}	~165 MTr/mm^{2}	ARMv9.2-A	—N/a			—N/a	4	4.4 GHz	—N/a	6	2.85 GHz	10-core	P-core: L1i: 192 KB; L1d: 128 KB E-core: L1i: 128 KB; L1d: 64 KB	P-core: 16 MB E-core: 4 MB	8 MB	8	128	1024	1470 MHz	3.01	Yes	16	38 TOPS	H.264, HEVC, ProRes, ProRes RAW	1	1	1	1	128-bit	8 channels 16-bit/channel	LPDDR5X-7500 (3750 MHz)	120 GB/s	16 GB	March 12, 2025
M4	APL1206; T8132		TSMC; N3E	28 billion	169.35 mm^{2}	~165 MTr/mm^{2}	ARMv9.2-A	—N/a			—N/a	4	4.4 GHz	—N/a	6	2.85 GHz	10-core	P-core: L1i: 192 KB; L1d: 128 KB E-core: L1i: 128 KB; L1d: 64 KB	P-core: 16 MB E-core: 4 MB	8 MB	10	160	1280	1470 MHz	3.76	Yes	16	38 TOPS	H.264, HEVC, ProRes, ProRes RAW	1	1	1	1	128-bit	8 channels 16-bit/channel	LPDDR5X-7500 (3750 MHz)	120 GB/s	16 GB; 24 GB; 32 GB	May 15, 2024
M4 Pro	T6040		TSMC; N3E				ARMv9.2-A	—N/a			—N/a	8	4.51 GHz	—N/a	4	2.59 GHz	12-core	P-core: L1i: 192 KB; L1d: 128 KB E-core: L1i: 128 KB; L1d: 64 KB	P-core: 32 MB E-core: 4 MB		16	256	2048	1578 MHz	6.46	Yes	16	38 TOPS	H.264, HEVC, ProRes, ProRes RAW	1	1	1	1	256-bit	16 channels 16-bit/channel	LPDDR5X-8533 (4266 MHz)	273 GB/s	24 GB; 48 GB; 64 GB	November 8, 2024
M4 Pro	T6040		TSMC; N3E				ARMv9.2-A	—N/a			—N/a	10	4.51 GHz	—N/a	4	2.59 GHz	14-core	P-core: L1i: 192 KB; L1d: 128 KB E-core: L1i: 128 KB; L1d: 64 KB	P-core: 32 MB E-core: 4 MB		20	320	2560	1578 MHz	8.08	Yes	16	38 TOPS	H.264, HEVC, ProRes, ProRes RAW	1	1	1	1	256-bit	16 channels 16-bit/channel	LPDDR5X-8533 (4266 MHz)	273 GB/s	24 GB; 48 GB; 64 GB	November 8, 2024
M4 Max	T6041		TSMC; N3E				ARMv9.2-A	—N/a			—N/a	10	4.51 GHz	—N/a	4	2.59 GHz	14-core	P-core: L1i: 192 KB; L1d: 128 KB E-core: L1i: 128 KB; L1d: 64 KB	P-core: 32 MB E-core: 4 MB		32	512	4096	1578 MHz	12.92	Yes	16	38 TOPS	H.264, HEVC, ProRes, ProRes RAW	1	2	2	1	384-bit	24 channels 16-bit/channel	LPDDR5X-8533 (4266 MHz)	409.6 GB/s	36 GB	November 8, 2024
M4 Max	T6041		TSMC; N3E				ARMv9.2-A	—N/a			—N/a	12	4.51 GHz	—N/a	4	2.59 GHz	16-core	P-core: L1i: 192 KB; L1d: 128 KB E-core: L1i: 128 KB; L1d: 64 KB	P-core: 32 MB E-core: 4 MB		40	640	5120	1578 MHz	16.16	Yes	16	38 TOPS	H.264, HEVC, ProRes, ProRes RAW	1	2	2	1	512-bit	32 channels 16-bit/channel	LPDDR5X-8533 (4266 MHz)	546 GB/s	48 GB; 64 GB; 128 GB	November 8, 2024
M5	T8142		TSMC; N3P		157.48 mm^{2}		ARMv9.2-A	—N/a	3	4.4 GHz	—N/a			—N/a	6	3.0 GHz	9-core	S-core: L1i: 192 KB; L1d: 128 KB E-core: L1i: 128 KB; L1d: 64 KB	S-core: 16 MB E-core: 6 MB	8 MB	10	160	1280	1620 MHz	4.15	Yes	16		H.264, HEVC, ProRes, ProRes RAW	1	1	1	1	128-bit	8 channels 16-bit/channel	LPDDR5X-9600 (4800 MHz)	153.6 GB/s	12 GB	October 15, 2025
M5	T8142		TSMC; N3P		157.48 mm^{2}		ARMv9.2-A	—N/a	4	4.46 GHz	—N/a			—N/a	6	3.0 GHz	10-core	S-core: L1i: 192 KB; L1d: 128 KB E-core: L1i: 128 KB; L1d: 64 KB	S-core: 16 MB E-core: 6 MB	8 MB	8	128	1024	1620 MHz	3.32	Yes	16		H.264, HEVC, ProRes, ProRes RAW	1	1	1	1	128-bit	8 channels 16-bit/channel	LPDDR5X-9600 (4800 MHz)	153.6 GB/s	16 GB	March 11, 2026
M5	T8142		TSMC; N3P		157.48 mm^{2}		ARMv9.2-A	—N/a	4	4.4–4.6 GHz	—N/a			—N/a	6	3.0 GHz	10-core	S-core: L1i: 192 KB; L1d: 128 KB E-core: L1i: 128 KB; L1d: 64 KB	S-core: 16 MB E-core: 6 MB	8 MB	10	160	1280	1620 MHz	4.15	Yes	16		H.264, HEVC, ProRes, ProRes RAW	1	1	1	1	128-bit	8 channels 16-bit/channel	LPDDR5X-9600 (4800 MHz)	153.6 GB/s	16 GB; 24 GB; 32 GB	October 15, 2025
M5 Pro	T6050		TSMC; N3P				ARMv9.2-A	—N/a	5	4.6 GHz	—N/a	10	4.4 GHz	—N/a			15-core	S-core: L1i: 192 KB; L1d: 128 KB P-core: L1i: 128 KB; L1d: 64 KB	S-core: 16 MB P-core: 16 MB	24 MB	16	256	2048	1620 MHz	6.64	Yes	16		H.264, HEVC, ProRes, ProRes RAW	1	1	1	1	256-bit	16 channels 16-bit/channel	LPDDR5X-9600 (4800 MHz)	307.2 GB/s	24 GB; 48 GB; 64 GB	March 11, 2026
M5 Pro	T6050		TSMC; N3P				ARMv9.2-A	—N/a	6	4.6 GHz	—N/a	12	4.4 GHz	—N/a			18-core	S-core: L1i: 192 KB; L1d: 128 KB P-core: L1i: 128 KB; L1d: 64 KB	S-core: 16 MB P-core: 16 MB	24 MB	20	320	2560	1620 MHz	8.29	Yes	16		H.264, HEVC, ProRes, ProRes RAW	1	1	1	1	256-bit	16 channels 16-bit/channel	LPDDR5X-9600 (4800 MHz)	307.2 GB/s	24 GB; 48 GB; 64 GB	March 11, 2026
M5 Max	T6051		TSMC; N3P				ARMv9.2-A	—N/a	6	4.6 GHz	—N/a	12	4.4 GHz	—N/a			18-core	S-core: L1i: 192 KB; L1d: 128 KB P-core: L1i: 128 KB; L1d: 64 KB	S-core: 16 MB P-core: 16 MB	48 MB	32	512	4096	1620 MHz	13.27	Yes	16		H.264, HEVC, ProRes, ProRes RAW	1	2	2	1	384-bit	24 channels 16-bit/channel	LPDDR5X-9600 (4800 MHz)	460.8 GB/s	36 GB	March 11, 2026
M5 Max	T6051		TSMC; N3P				ARMv9.2-A	—N/a	6	4.6 GHz	—N/a	12	4.4 GHz	—N/a			18-core	S-core: L1i: 192 KB; L1d: 128 KB P-core: L1i: 128 KB; L1d: 64 KB	S-core: 16 MB P-core: 16 MB	48 MB	40	640	5120	1620 MHz	16.59	Yes	16		H.264, HEVC, ProRes, ProRes RAW	1	2	2	1	512-bit	32 channels 16-bit/channel	LPDDR5X-9600 (4800 MHz)	614.4 GB/s	48 GB; 64 GB; 128 GB	March 11, 2026
M5 Ultra	T6052		TSMC; N3P				ARMv9.2-A	—N/a	10	4.6 GHz	—N/a	20	4.4 GHz	—N/a			30-core	S-core: L1i: 192 KB; L1d: 128 KB P-core: L1i: 128 KB; L1d: 64 KB	S-core: 16 MB P-core: 16 MB	96 MB	64	1024	8192	1620 MHz	26.54	Yes	32		H.264, HEVC, ProRes, ProRes RAW	2	4	4	1	1024-bit	64 channels 16-bit/channel	LPDDR5X-9600 (4800 MHz)	1.2 TB/s	96 GB; 256 GB	September 22, 2026
M5 Ultra	T6052		TSMC; N3P				ARMv9.2-A	—N/a	12	4.6 GHz	—N/a	24	4.4 GHz	—N/a			36-core	S-core: L1i: 192 KB; L1d: 128 KB P-core: L1i: 128 KB; L1d: 64 KB	S-core: 16 MB P-core: 16 MB	96 MB	80	1280	10240	1620 MHz	33.18	Yes	32		H.264, HEVC, ProRes, ProRes RAW	2	4	4	1	1024-bit	64 channels 16-bit/channel	LPDDR5X-9600 (4800 MHz)	1.2 TB/s	96 GB; 256 GB; 512 GB	September 22, 2026
M6	T8152		TSMC; N2					—N/a	2	4.79 GHz	—N/a	4	4.5 GHz	—N/a	6	2.94 GHz	12-core	S-core: L1i: 192 KB; L1d: 128 KB P-core: L1i: 128 KB; L1d: 64 KB E-core: L1i: 160 KB; L1d: 96 KB			12	192	1536	1735 MHz	5.33	Yes	32		H.264, HEVC, ProRes, ProRes RAW	1	1	1	1	128-bit	8 channels 16-bit/channel	LPDDR5X-9600 (4800 MHz)	153.6 GB/s	16 GB	September 22, 2026
M6	T8152		TSMC; N2					—N/a	2	4.79 GHz	—N/a	4	4.5 GHz	—N/a	6	2.94 GHz	12-core	S-core: L1i: 192 KB; L1d: 128 KB P-core: L1i: 128 KB; L1d: 64 KB E-core: L1i: 160 KB; L1d: 96 KB			12	192	1536	1735 MHz	5.33	Yes	32		H.264, HEVC, ProRes, ProRes RAW	1	1	1	1	128-bit	8 channels 16-bit/channel	LPDDR5X-10666 (5333 MHz)	170.6 GB/s	24 GB; 32 GB	September 22, 2026

== R-series SoCs ==
The R series is a family of low-latency system on a chip (SoC) for real-time processing of sensor inputs.

=== Apple R1 ===
The Apple R1 was announced by Apple on June 5, 2023, at its Worldwide Developers Conference. It is used in the Apple Vision Pro headset. The R1 chip is dedicated to real-time processing of sensor inputs and delivers extremely low-latency images to the display.

== S-series SiPs ==
Evolution of Apple S series

S1; September 9, 2014 – September 7, 2016
S2; September 7, 2016 – September 12, 2017
S1P; September 7, 2016 – September 12, 2018
S3; September 12, 2017 – September 7, 2022
S4; September 12, 2018 – September 10, 2019
S5; September 10, 2019 – October 13, 2026
S6; September 15, 2020 – September 14, 2021
S7; September 14, 2021 – September 7, 2022; January 18, 2023 – present
S8; September 7, 2022 – September 9, 2025
S9; September 12, 2023 – September 9, 2025
S10; September 9, 2024 – present
S11; September 9, 2026 – present

The S series is a family of systems in a package (SiP) used in the Apple Watch and HomePod. It uses a customized application processor that together with memory, storage and support processors for wireless connectivity, sensors, and I/O form a complete computer in a single package.

=== Apple S1 ===
The Apple S1 is an integrated computer. It includes memory, storage and support circuits like wireless modems and I/O controllers in a sealed integrated package. It was announced on September 9, 2014, as part of the "Wish we could say more" event. It was used in the first-generation Apple Watch.

==== Apple S1P ====
Used in Apple Watch Series 1. It has a dual-core processor identical to the S2, with the exception of the built-in GPS receiver. It contains the same dual-core CPU with the same new GPU capabilities as the S2, making it about 50% faster than the S1.

=== Apple S2 ===
Used in the Apple Watch Series 2. It has a dual-core processor and a built-in GPS receiver. The S2's two cores deliver 50% higher performance and the GPU delivers twice as much as the predecessor, and is similar in performance to the Apple S1P.

=== Apple S3 ===
Used in the Apple Watch Series 3. It has a dual-core processor that is 70% faster than the Apple S2 and a built-in GPS receiver. There is also an option for a cellular modem and an internal eSIM module. It also includes the W2 chip. The S3 also contains a barometric altimeter, the W2 wireless connectivity processor, and in some models UMTS (3G) and LTE (4G) cellular modems served by a built-in eSIM.

=== Apple S4 ===
Used in the Apple Watch Series 4. It introduced 64-bit ARMv8 cores to the Apple Watch through two Tempest cores, which are also found in the A12 as energy-efficient cores. Despite its small size, Tempest uses a 3-wide decode out-of-order superscalar design, which makes it much more powerful than preceding in-order cores.

The S4 contains a Neural Engine that is able to run Core ML. Third-party apps can use it starting from watchOS 6. The SiP also includes new accelerometer and gyroscope functionality that has twice the dynamic range in measurable values of its predecessor, as well as being able to sample data at 8 times the speed. It contains the W3 wireless chip, which supports Bluetooth 5. It also contains a new custom GPU, which can use the Metal API.

=== Apple S5 ===
Used in the Apple Watch Series 5, SE, and HomePod Mini. It adds a built-in magnetometer to the custom 64-bit dual-core processor and GPU of the S4.

=== Apple S6 ===
Used in the Apple Watch Series 6. It has a custom 64-bit dual-core processor that runs up to 20 percent faster than the S5. The dual-cores in the S6 are based on the A13 Bionic's energy-efficient "little" Thunder cores at 1.8 GHz. Like the S4 and S5, it also contains the W3 wireless chip. The S6 adds the new U1 ultrawide band chip, an always-on altimeter, and 5 GHz WiFi.

=== Apple S7 ===
Used in the Apple Watch Series 7 and second-generation HomePod. The S7 CPU has the same T8301 identifier and quoted performance as the S6. It is the second time utilizing the energy-efficient "little" Thunder cores of the A13 Bionic.

=== Apple S8 ===
Used in the Apple Watch SE (2nd generation), Series 8, and Ultra. The S8 CPU has the same T8301 identifier and quoted performance as the S6 and S7. It is the final CPU to utilize the energy-efficient "little" Thunder cores of the A13 Bionic.

=== Apple S9 ===
Used in the Apple Watch Series 9 and Ultra 2. The S9 CPU has a new dual-core CPU with 60 percent more transistors than the S8, a new four-core Neural Engine and the new U2 ultra-wide band chip. The dual-cores in the S9 are based on the A16 Bionic's energy efficient "little" Sawtooth cores.

=== Apple S10 ===
Used in the Apple Watch Series 10, Series 11, SE 3, Ultra 3, and HomePod Mini 2. It is the final CPU to utilize the energy-efficient "little" Sawtooth cores of the A16 Bionic.

=== Apple S11 ===
Used in the Apple Watch Series 12 and Ultra 4. The S11 is derived from the A20 Pro. It adds an always-on processor which includes a Secure Exclave enabling Audio Intelligence features.

=== Comparison of S-series processors ===
Name	Part no.	Model no.	Image	Semiconductor technology	Die size	CPU ISA	CPU	CPU cache	GPU	Memory technology	Modem	First release
S1	APL; 0778	S7002		28 nm Hκ MG	32 mm^{2}	ARMv7k	520 MHz single-core Cortex-A7	L1d: 32 KB; L2: 256 KB	PowerVR Series 5	LPDDR3	?	April 24, 2015
S1P	?	T8002		?		ARMv7k	520 MHz dual-core Cortex-A7	L1d: 32 KB	PowerVR Series 6 'Rogue'	LPDDR3	?	September 12, 2016
S2	?	T8002		?		ARMv7k	520 MHz dual-core Cortex-A7	L1d: 32 KB	PowerVR Series 6 'Rogue'	LPDDR3	?	September 12, 2016
S3	?	T8004		?		ARMv7k	Dual-core	?		LPDDR4	Qualcomm MDM9635M; Snapdragon X7 LTE	September 22, 2017
S4	APL1W82	T8006		7 nm (TSMC N7)	?	ARMv8.3-A ILP32	1.59 GHz Dual-core Tempest	L1d: 32 KB; L2: 2 MB	Apple G11M	LPDDR4X	?	September 21, 2018
S5	APL1W82	T8006		7 nm (TSMC N7)	?	ARMv8.3-A ILP32	1.59 GHz Dual-core Tempest	L1d: 32 KB; L2: 2 MB	Apple G11M	LPDDR4X	?	September 20, 2019
S6	APL1W86	T8301		7 nm (TSMC N7P)	?	ARMv8.4-A	1.8 GHz Dual-core Thunder	L1d: 48 KB; L2: 4 MB	?	LPDDR4X	?	September 18, 2020
S7	APL1W86	T8301		7 nm (TSMC N7P)	?	ARMv8.4-A	1.8 GHz Dual-core Thunder	L1d: 48 KB; L2: 4 MB	?	LPDDR4X	?	October 15, 2021
S8	APL1W86	T8301		7 nm (TSMC N7P)	?	ARMv8.4-A	1.8 GHz Dual-core Thunder	L1d: 48 KB; L2: 4 MB	?	LPDDR4X	?	September 16, 2022
S9	APL1W15	T8310		4 nm (TSMC N4)	?	ARMv8.6-A	Dual-core Sawtooth	L1d: 64 KB; L2: 4 MB	?	LPDDR5	?	September 22, 2023
S10	APL1W15	T8310		4 nm (TSMC N4)	?	ARMv8.6-A	Dual-core Sawtooth	L1d: 64 KB; L2: 4 MB	?	LPDDR5	?	September 20, 2024

== T-series SoCs ==
The T series "transition" chips perform various functions on Intel-based MacBook and iMac computers released from 2016 onwards. The chip processes and encrypts biometric information (Touch ID) and acts as a gatekeeper to the microphone and FaceTime HD camera, protecting them from hacking. The chip runs bridgeOS, a purported variant of watchOS. The functions of the T-series processor were built into the M-series CPUs, thus ending the need for the T series.

=== Apple T1 ===
The Apple T1 chip is an ARMv7 SoC (derived from the processor in the Apple Watch's S2) that drives the System Management Controller (SMC) and Touch ID sensor of the 2016 and 2017 MacBook Pro with Touch Bar.

=== Apple T2 ===
The Apple T2 security chip is a SoC first released in the iMac Pro. It includes a 64-bit ARMv8 processor (a variant of the processor in the A10 Fusion, or T8010) and a separate Secure Enclave Processor. It provides a secure enclave for encrypted keys using the Secure Enclave Processor, enables users to lock down the computer's boot process, handles system functions like the camera and audio control, and handles on-the-fly encryption and decryption for the solid-state drive. T2 also delivers "enhanced imaging processing" for the iMac Pro's FaceTime HD camera.

=== Comparison of T-series processors ===
Name	Model no.	Image	Semiconductor technology	Die size	CPU ISA	CPU	CPU cache	GPU	Memory technology	First release
Name	Model no.	Image	Semiconductor technology	Die size	CPU ISA	CPU	CPU cache	GPU	Memory bandwidth	First release
T1	APL; 1023	Apple T1 Processor	TBC	TBC	ARMv7			TBD		November; 12, 2016
T2	APL; 1027	Apple T2 Processor	TSMC 16 nm FinFET.	104 mm^{2}	ARMv8-A; ARMv7-A	2× Hurricane; 2× Zephyr + Cortex-A7	L1i: 64 KB; L1d: 64 KB; L2: 3 MB	3× cores	LP-DDR4	December; 14, 2017

== C-series cellular modems ==
The C series is a family of cellular modem chips.

=== Apple C1 ===
The Apple C1 is a cellular modem chip introduced in the iPhone 16e. It is built on the N4 process node by TSMC. It supports UMTS/HSPA+, Gigabit LTE, and 5G (sub-6 GHz), but lacks DC-HSDPA and mmWave, which are supported by other iPhone 16 models. Apple claims that the C1 is more power efficient than previous iPhone modems and consumes 20–25% less power than the Qualcomm modems used in other iPhone 16 models.

==== Apple C1X ====
The Apple C1X is a variant of the C1, offering up to twice the speed. It first appeared in the iPhone Air, and is also used in the M5-based iPad Pro, iPhone 17e, and the M4-based iPad Air.

=== Apple C2 ===
The Apple C2 is the second-generation cellular modem developed by Apple. It was introduced in the iPhone 18 Pro, iPhone 18 Pro Max (non-US models), and iPhone Duo in September 2026. The US model iPhone 18 Pro Max still uses a Qualcomm modem. It supports 5G FR1 and FR2 and Gigabit LTE. Apple claims that the C2 provides faster uploads than the C1X while using 15% less energy.

=== Comparison of C-series cellular modems ===
Name	Baseband process	Transceiver process	5G / LTE MIMO	mmWave 5G support	Release
Apple C1	4 nm (TSMC N4)	7 nm	4×4 / 4×4	No (sub-6 GHz only)	February 2025
Apple C1X	4 nm (TSMC N4)	7 nm	4×4 / 4×4	No (sub-6 GHz only)	September 2025
Apple C2	4 nm (TSMC N4)	7 nm	4×4 / 4×4	Yes (U.S. only)	September 2026

== U-series SiPs (Ultra-wideband) ==
The U series is a family of systems in a package (SiP) implementing ultra-wideband (UWB) radio.

=== Apple U1 ===
The Apple U1 is used in the iPhone 11/11 Pro series through the iPhone 14/14 Pro series (excluding the second and third generation iPhone SE), Apple Watch Series 6 through Series 8, Apple Watch Ultra (1st generation), HomePod (2nd generation), HomePod Mini, AirTag (first generation), and the charging case for AirPods Pro (2nd generation).

=== Apple U2 ===
The Apple U2 (also referred to by Apple as its "Second-generation Ultra Wideband chip") is used in the iPhone 15/15 Pro series and newer (excluding iPhone 16e and iPhone 17e), iPhone Air, Apple Watch Series 9 and newer, Apple Watch Ultra 2 and newer, the charging case for AirPods Pro (3rd generation) and the AirTag (second generation).

=== Comparison of U-series processors ===
Name	Model no.	Image	CPU	Semiconductor technology	First release
U1	TMK A75	Apple U1 chip	Cortex-M4; ARMv7E-M	16 nm FinFET (TSMC 16FF)	September 20, 2019
U2	TMQE08			7 nm HKMG finFET	September 22, 2023

== W- and N-series SoCs (Wireless connectivity) ==
The W, starting with the W2, and N series are a family of RF SoCs used for wireless connectivity (Bluetooth, Wi-Fi and Thread (N series only)).

=== Apple W2 ===
The Apple W2, used in the Apple Watch Series 3, is integrated into the Apple S3 SiP. Apple claimed the chip makes Wi-Fi 85% faster and allows Bluetooth and Wi-Fi to use half the power of the W1 implementation.

=== Apple W3 ===
The Apple W3 is used in the Apple Watch Series 4 and newer, SE (1st generation) and newer, and Ultra (1st generation) and newer. It is integrated into the Apple S4 through S10 SiPs. It supports Bluetooth 5.0/5.3.

=== Apple N1 ===
The Apple N1 (codename Proxima) is used in the iPhone 17, iPhone 17 Pro, iPhone Air, iPad Pro (M5), iPad Air (M4), M5 MacBook Air, M5 Pro and M5 Max MacBook Pro, M5 Max and M5 Ultra Mac Studio, M6 and M5 Pro Mac Mini, M6 iMac and M6 MacBook Pro. It incorporates Wi-Fi 7, Bluetooth 6, and Thread into one chip. Apple claims the chip will help boost the performance and reliability of features like AirDrop and Personal Hotspot.

=== Comparison of W-series processors ===
Name	Model no.	Image	Semiconductor technology	Die size	Bluetooth certification	First release
W2	338S00348	Apple W2 chip	TBC		4.2	September; 22, 2017
W3	338S00464	Apple W3 chip	TBC		5.0/5.3	September; 21, 2018

== W1 and H-series SoCs (Bluetooth/audio processing) ==
The W1 and the H series are a family of SoCs with Bluetooth wireless connectivity and low-power audio processing for use in headphones and speakers.

=== Apple W1 ===
The Apple W1 is a SoC used in the 2016 AirPods and select Beats headphones. It maintains a Bluetooth Class 1 connection with a computer device and decodes the audio stream that is sent to it. Its die size is 14.3 mm^{2}.

=== Apple H1 ===
The Apple H1 chip was used in the second and third generation AirPods, first generation AirPods Pro and first generation AirPods Max. It was also used in the Powerbeats Pro, the Beats Solo Pro, Beats Fit Pro and the 2020 Powerbeats. Specifically designed for headphones, it has Bluetooth 5.0, supports hands-free "Hey Siri" commands, and offers 30 percent lower latency than the W1 chip used in earlier AirPods.

=== Apple H2 ===
The Apple H2 chip is used in AirPods 4, AirPods 5, AirPods Pro 2, AirPods Pro 3, AirPods Max 2, and Apple Vision Pro. It was also used in the Powerbeats Pro 2. It has Bluetooth 5.3, and implements 48 kHz noise reduction in hardware. The 2022 version of the H2 operates only on the 2.4 GHz frequency, while the 2023 version adds support for audio transmission using a proprietary protocol in two specific frequency ranges of the 5 GHz band.

=== Comparison of Bluetooth audio processors ===
Name	Model no.	Image	Bluetooth certification	First release
W1	343S00130 (AirPods 1st Generation); 343S00131 (Beats Studio)	Apple W1 chip	4.2	December; 13, 2016
H1	343S00289 (AirPods 2nd Generation); 343S00290 (AirPods 3rd Generation); 343S00404 (AirPods Max); H1 SiP (AirPods Pro) Powerbeats Fit	Apple H1 chip Apple H1 SiP	5.0	March 20, 2019
H2	AirPods (4th generation) AirPods (5th generation); AirPods Pro (2nd generation) AirPods Pro (3rd generation); Apple Vision Pro; AirPods Max 2 Powerbeats Pro 2		5.3	September 7, 2022

== M-series motion coprocessors ==
The M series of motion coprocessors are used by Apple Inc. in their mobile devices. First released in 2013, their function is to collect sensor data from integrated accelerometers, gyroscopes, and compasses. They offload collecting and processing sensor data from the main central processing unit (CPU).

Only the M7 and M8 motion coprocessors were housed on separate chips produced by NXP Semiconductors, while the M9, M10, and M11 were embedded in their corresponding A-series chips. Beginning with the A12 Bionic chip in 2018, the motion coprocessors were fully integrated into the SoC. Apple eventually reused the M codename for their desktop SoCs.

=== Comparison of M-series motion coprocessors ===
Name	Model no.	Image	Semiconductor technology	CPU ISA	CPU	First release
Apple M7	LPC18A1	NXP LPC18A1	90 nm	ARMv7-M	150 MHz Cortex-M3	September; 10, 2013
Apple M8	LPC18B1	NXP LPC18B1	90 nm	ARMv7-M	150 MHz Cortex-M3	September; 9, 2014

== Miscellaneous devices ==
This segment is about Apple-designed processors that are not easily sorted into another section.

=== Early series ===
Apple first used Samsung-developed SoCs in early versions of the iPhone and iPod Touch. They combine in one package a single ARM-based processing core (CPU), a graphics processing unit (GPU), and other electronics necessary for mobile computing.

The APL0098 (also 8900B or S5L8900) is a package on package (PoP) system on a chip (SoC) that was introduced on June 29, 2007, at the launch of the original iPhone. It includes a 412 MHz single-core ARM11 CPU and a PowerVR MBX Lite GPU. It was manufactured by Samsung on a 90 nm process. The iPhone 3G and the first-generation iPod Touch also use it.

The APL0278 (also S5L8720) is a PoP SoC introduced on September 9, 2008, at the launch of the second-generation iPod Touch. It includes a 533 MHz single-core ARM11 CPU and a PowerVR MBX Lite GPU. It was manufactured by Samsung on a 65 nm process.

The APL0298 (also S5L8920) is a PoP SoC introduced on June 8, 2009, at the launch of the iPhone 3GS. It includes a 600 MHz single-core Cortex-A8 CPU and a PowerVR SGX535 GPU. It was manufactured by Samsung on a 65 nm process.

The APL2298 (also S5L8922) is a 45 nm die shrunk version of the iPhone 3GS SoC and was introduced on September 9, 2009, at the launch of the third-generation iPod Touch.

=== Other ===
The Samsung S5L8747 is an ARM-based microcontroller used in Apple's Lightning Digital AV Adapter, a Lightning-to-HDMI adapter. This is a miniature computer with 256 MB RAM, running an XNU kernel loaded from the connected iPhone, iPod Touch, or iPad, then taking a serial signal from the iOS device translating that into a proper HDMI signal.

Model no.	Image	First release	CPU ISA	Specs	Application	Utilizing devices	Operating system
339S0196	339S0196 microcontroller	September 2012	Unknown ARM	256 MB; RAM	Lightning to HDMI conversion	Apple Digital; AV Adapter	XNU

APL1097 (or ACE3), is a USB controller with support for USB Power Delivery and vendor-defined messages, designed by Apple, made by Texas Instruments. It is used in iPhone 15, 16 and 17 series. Successor to ACE2 (CD3217B12 or CD3217B13).

== Non-Apple operating systems ==
- Asahi Linux, which is a project that ports the Linux kernel onto Apple silicon-powered Macs.
- iDroid, which was a project that ports Android onto early Samsung-developed SoCs, with unfinished work on the A4 SoC.
- Project Sandcastle, which is a project that ports Android for A10 Fusion SoC on iPhone 7 and 7 Plus.

== Hypervisors ==
Parallels Desktop for Mac and VMware Fusion are hypervisors that run on macOS and that can run macOS and other operating systems, such as Windows and Linux, on virtual machines.

== See also ==
- List of iPhone models
- List of iPad models
- List of Mac models grouped by CPU type
- List of Samsung platforms (SoCs):
  - Exynos (none have been used by Apple)
  - historical (some were used in Apple products)
- PowerVR SGX GPUs were also used in the iPhone 3GS and the third-generation iPod Touch
- PWRficient, a processor designed by P.A. Semi, a company Apple acquired to form an in-house custom chip design department

=== Similar platforms ===
- A31 by AllWinner
- Atom by Intel
- BCM2xxxx by Broadcom
- eMAG and Altra by Ampere Computing
- Exynos by Samsung
- i.MX by Freescale Semiconductor
- Jaguar and Puma by AMD
- Kirin by HiSilicon
- MTxxxx by MediaTek
- NovaThor by ST-Ericsson
- OMAP by Texas Instruments
- RK3xxx by Rockchip
- Snapdragon by Qualcomm
- Tegra by Nvidia
- XRING by Xiaomi
