= Single-core =

Microprocessor containing a single core

A single-core processor is a microprocessor with a single CPU on its die. It performs the fetch-decode-execute cycle one at a time, as it only runs on one thread. A computer using a single core CPU is generally slower than a multi-core system.

Single core processors used to be widespread in desktop computers, but as applications demanded more processing power, the slower speed of single core systems became a detriment to performance. Windows supported single-core processors up until the release of Windows 11, where a dual-core processor is required.

Single core processors are still in use in some niche circumstances. Some older legacy systems like those running antiquated operating systems (e.g. Windows 98) cannot gain any benefit from multi-core processors. Single core processors are also used in hobbyist computers like the Raspberry Pi and Single-board microcontrollers. The production of single-core desktop processors ended in 2013 with the Celeron G440, G460, G465 & G470.

== Development ==
The first single core processor was the Intel 4004, which was commercially released on November 15, 1971 by Intel. Since then many improvements have been made to single core processors, going from the 740 kHz of the Intel 4004 to the 2 GHz Celeron G470.

=== Advantages ===
- Single core processors draw less power than larger, multi-core processors.
- Single core processors can be made a lot more cheaply than multi core systems, meaning they can be used in embedded systems.

=== Disadvantages ===
- Single-core processors are generally outperformed by multi-core processors.
- Single-core processors are more likely to bottleneck with faster peripheral components, as these components have to wait for the CPU to finish its cycle.
- Single-core processors lack parallelisation, meaning only one application can run at once. This reduces performance as other processes have to wait for processor time, leading to process starvation.

== Increasing parallel trend ==
- Single-core – one processor on a die. Since about 2012, most smartphone CPUs marketed are no longer single-core; Microcontrollers are still single-core, while there are exceptions.
- Multi-core processors – a 'few' processors on a die, e.g. 2, 4, 8.
- Manycore processors – a 'large number' of processors on a die, e.g. 10s, 100s, 1000s. Some specialist ASICs/Accelerators and GPUs fall into this category.
