= Apple Watch SE =

Line of smartwatches

The Apple Watch SE is a line of entry-level smartwatches produced by Apple as part of the Apple Watch product line. It may refer to:

- Apple Watch SE (1st generation), released in 2020
- Apple Watch SE (2nd generation), released in 2022
- Apple Watch SE 3, released in 2025
