= Humanoid hand =

Human-like hands of robots

Humanoid robots generally have some means of handling objects. The simplest typically involves two "fingers", without pressure sensors to allow the robot to calibrate the amount of force to the object. More sophisticated versions attempt to closely mimic the hand. The hand is one of the most complex mechanical subsystems in the human body. A biological hand has approximately 27 degrees of freedom (DoF), thousands of tactile receptors, fine force control, is waterproof. Hands must also be durable, affordable, mass-producible, and tolerate varying environmental conditions (water, heat,...).

As of April 2026, leading humanoid developers have converged on five-fingered, anthropomorphic hands, but their design philosophies diverge sharply in actuation, sensing, materials, and control architecture, as demonstrated by Tesla Optimus (Gen 3), Figure 02/Helix 02, Sanctuary AI Phoenix, Boston Dynamics Atlas (electric production version), Apptronik Apollo, and the research benchmark Shadow Dexterous Hand.

== History ==
Early robotic hands, such as the 1960s Stanford/JPL hand or 1980s Utah/MIT hand, were laboratory prototypes that prioritized research over practicality. By the 2000s, commercial efforts such as the Shadow Dexterous Hand (first released in 2005) established the standard. Shadow's design supported 20 DoF with 24 independent movements, tendon-driven actuation, and extensive tactile sensing. These research hands were expensive (often exceeding $100,000 per unit) and fragile, thus unsuitable for real-world deployment.

The modern wave of general-purpose humanoids, began in 2022, prioritized mass manufacturability, cost, and AI-driven control.

== Design ==
Hands must be lightweight (to preserve battery life and balance), rugged enough for factory or home use, and compatible with end-to-end neural networks (end-to-end implies that all behavior comes from the network rather than explicitly coded logic). Developers have converged on tendon-driven or hybrid actuation to move motors out of the fingers, but they differ on whether to use electric, hydraulic, or hybrid systems and how to embed tactile sensing.

== Products ==
=== Apptronik Apollo ===
The first-generation Apollo, unveiled by Apptronik in 2023, launched with a simple, low-dexterity gripper of about 0 to 1 degrees of freedom, suited to what the company called "gross manipulation": moving boxes, totes, and crates that can be grasped with two hands without a fully dexterous hand or wrist. These early hands were sourced from third-party makers of robotic prosthetics rather than developed in-house.

Apptronik later adopted the Ability Hand from the prosthetics company Psyonic across its humanoid lineup, including in automotive manufacturing demonstrations. Originally a prosthetic device, the Ability Hand is a carbon-fibre unit weighing about 500 grams with six active degrees of freedom, flexion and extension for each finger plus thumb rotation. According to Psyonic, it carries 37 tactile and positional sensors, including six force-sensitive resistors per finger and vibration-based haptic feedback, and closes its fingers in about 200 milliseconds. The same hardware serves both prosthetic wearers and robots, differing mainly in the control interface.

=== Boston Dynamics Atlas ===
Boston Dynamics 2026 electric production version. The electric Atlas uses hands with integrated tactile sensing in fingers and palms, though exact DoF figures are not public, beyond the overall robot's 56 DoF. Emphasis is on industrial durability, 50 kg payload, and 3D-printed titanium/aluminum components. Hands are designed for fenceless factory integration and heavy material handling.

- Strengths: Rugged, production-ready construction with proven whole-body dynamics.
- Weaknesses: Less public data on fine dexterity; appears optimized more for gripping and lifting than fine manipulation.

=== Figure 02 / Helix 02 ===
Figure AI's fourth-generation hand on the Figure 02 (and its Helix 02 software update) offers16 DoF per hand with electric actuators and sensors in each finger. Each finger is powered by a self-contained unit containing motor and sensors, with wiring routed through a human-like wrist. Payload capacity reaches 25 kg per hand (combined arm strength), and fingertip tactile sensors detect forces as low as 3 grams. Palm cameras provide in-hand visual feedback when objects are occluded from head cameras. The design prioritizes force-modulated grasping and contact-aware manipulation, trained end-to-end with Figure's Helix AI. Hands are electric, emphasizing reliability and lower maintenance.

- Strengths: Tactile sensitivity, integrated vision-in-hand, and AI-driven autonomy demonstrations (e.g., autonomous cube reorientation).
- Weaknesses: Fewer DoF.

=== Fourier GR-2 ===
The Fourier GR-2 has 12 DoF.

- Strengths: Real-time grip adaptation using tactile arrays, balance between cost and performance, and warehouse and logistics work
- Weaknesses: Moderate DoF, less advanced in-hand manipulation compared to Sanctuary or Tesla, limited public long-term durability data

=== Honda Avatar ===
The Honda Avatar has 16 cable-driven joints.

- Strengths: Exceptional durability and reliability (automotive-grade engineering), high grip strength, excellent long-term cycling performance
- Weaknesses: Fewer DoF, more conservative design focused on reliability over dexterity

=== Sanctuary AI Phoenix ===
Sanctuary AI's Phoenix (7th–8th generation as of 2026) features 20–21 DoF per hand driven by a proprietary hydraulic system. Hands include micro-barometer-based tactile arrays (7 cells per finger pad) with sensitivity of 5 mN (near-human level). Hydraulic actuation provides high force density and compliance, enabling the robot to perform 98% of warehouse manual tasks with high fidelity.

- Strengths: Tactile feedback and hydraulic power for heavy, compliant manipulation. Demonstrated autonomous learning of new tasks in under 24 hours via reinforcement learning.
- Weaknesses: Hydraulic systems require fluid maintenance, sealing, and add weight/complexity compared with fully electric designs.

=== Tesla Optimus (Gen 3) ===
Tesla's Optimus Gen 3 (also referred to as V3 in patent filings) represents the most production-oriented hand design among major players. Each hand features 22 degrees of freedom, approaching the human hand's 27 DoF. The key innovation is relocation of (heavy) actuators to the forearm, using a tendon-driven system with three thin, flexible control cables per finger routed through a wrist joint that minimizes crosstalk. This yields a total of 25 actuators per hand/forearm. The design emphasizes high-volume manufacturing compatibility with Tesla's automotive supply chain. Fingers use lightweight polymer segments and precision joint assemblies achieving 0.08 mm positional accuracy, enabling delicate tasks such as threading a needle, tying shoelaces, sorting laundry, and gripping an egg without crushing it. Tactile sensing is present but less emphasized in public disclosures than in competitors; the focus is on vision-based control via Tesla's neural net software.

- Strengths: Lightweight fingers, low part count, and integration with AI stack. Demonstrated real-world factory tasks in 2026 footage.
- Weaknesses: Tendon routing (e.g., from forearm to finger) can introduce compliance and wear issues; less published data on long-term durability under heavy industrial loads compared with hydraulic rivals.

=== UBTech Walker S2 ===
The UBtech Robotics Walker S2 has 7-10 DoF.

- Strengths: Platform with reliability in service robotics, affordable, and tool-handling capability
- Weaknesses: Least dexterity, basic tactile sensing, more focused on whole-body mobility than hand finesse

=== Unitree H2 ===
The Unitree Robotics H2 hand has 10-12 DoF.

- Strengths: Low cost, fast iteration cycle, already shipping in volume, good for basic industrial and service tasks
- Weaknesses: Lower dexterity and tactile feedback than premium competitors, still evolving fine manipulation capabilitie

== Technical comparison ==
Major commercial hands now offer at least 16 DoF and incorporate some form of tactile feedback, much improved over 2022–2023 designs. Electric tendon-driven systems (Tesla, Figure) dominate for cost and simplicity, while hydraulic (Sanctuary) excels in force density and compliance. Shadow remains the research standard but is too expensive and fragile for mass deployment.

Humanoid hands (per hand)
Model	DoF	Actuation	Tactile sensing	Payload	Precision	Manufacturability
Apptronik	Limited		Multi-touch			Proven
Boston Dynamics Atlas	Not disclosed (human-scale)	Electric	Fingers + palms	50 kg overall	Industrial focus	Very high
Figure 02	16	Integrated electric per finger	Fingertip + palm cameras (3 g sensitivity)	25 kg	High (force-modulated)	High
Fourier GR-2	12	Electric (dexterous)	6-array tactile sensors per hand	Not disclosed (industrial-grade)	High (real-time grip adaptation)	High
Honda Avatar Robot / latest humanoid	16 joints (4 fingers + thumb, cable-driven)	Cable-driven electric (motors in forearm)	Tactile + force sensors in fingers and palm	High grip force (5× previous ASIMO)	Sub-millimeter (durable over 450,000 cycles)	High (automotive-grade durability)
Sanctuary Phoenix	20–21	Hydraulic	5 mN micro-barometers	25 kg	High (compliant)	Medium
Shadow Dexterous Hand (benchmark)	20 (24 movements)	Tendon-driven electric	Extensive (position + tactile)	Research-level	Sub-millimeter	Low (research)
Tesla Optimus Gen 3	22	Tendon-driven electric (25 motors in forearm)		Not disclosed	0.08 mm	High (automotive supply chain)
UBTech Walker S2	~7–10 (5-finger dexterous)	Electric servo-driven	Force feedback + basic tactile	Not disclosed (industrial focus)	High (tool manipulation)	High (mass production)
Unitree H2	~10–12 (DEX5-1 five-finger option)	Electric (tendon or direct-drive)	Optional tactile sensing	Arm: 7 kg rated / 15–21 kg peak	High (industrial tasks)	Very high (mass-market focus)

== Challenges ==
Common challenges include tendon wear, actuator miniaturization, sensor durability under repeated impacts, and control. Maximizing an end-effector's handling performance requires evaluating the downstream physical tradeoffs between total arm load metrics, component weight distributions, and structural payload capacities. Compared developers are moving toward end-to-end neural policies rather than classical control. Tesla's vision-only approach contrasts with Figure's multi-modal (vision + tactile) and Sanctuary's reinforcement-learning focus. Future hands will likely combine 22+ DoF, sub-5 mN tactile sensitivity, forearm-located actuators and seamless neural control. Cost are expected to drop below $5,000/hand before mass adoption. Research is examining hybrid electro-hydraulic and artificial-muscle designs.

== See also ==
- Humanoid robot
