= Deep Robotics =

Chinese robotics company

Hangzhou Yunshenchu Technology Co., Ltd.
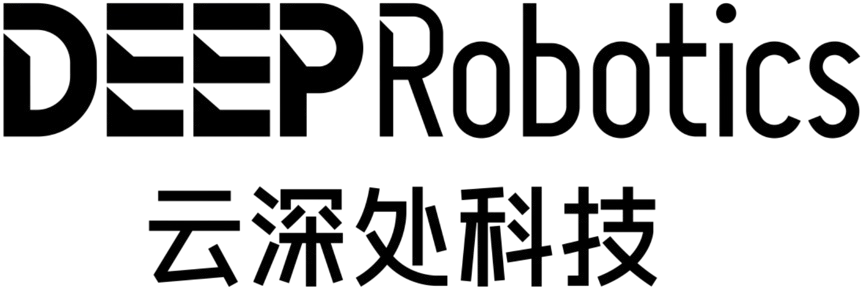
- Trade name: Deep Robotics
- Native name: 杭州云深处科技有限公司
- Company type: Private
- Industry: Robotics
- Founded: 29 November 2017; 8 years ago
- Founders: Zhu Qiuguo; Li Chao
- Headquarters: Hangzhou, Zhejiang, China
- Website: www.deeprobotics.cn

Hangzhou Yunshenchu Technology Co., Ltd. (known as Deep Robotics; Chinese: 云深处科技; pinyin: Yúnshēnchù Kējì) is Chinese robotics company headquartered in Hangzhou, Zhejiang.

The company has gained attention from the media due to its development of quadruped robots particularly for industrial use.

== Background ==
Deep Robotics was founded in 2017 by Zhu Qiuguo and Li Chao. The two held doctorate degrees from Zhejiang University. After graduating in 2011, Zhu worked at the university as an associate professor until he decided to from his own company with Li.

Clients and partners of Deep Robotics include Lenovo, Takenaka Corporation, University College London and the University of Edinburgh.

== Product history ==
A few months after establishment, Deep Robotics launched the first generation of quadruped robot named Jueying. The name came from Cao Cao's horse during the Three Kingdoms period.

In August 2021, Deep Robotics launched the Jueying X20 model. It is an industrial grade waterproof robot designed to be used for industrial purposes and rescue missions.

In March 2023, Deep Robotics launched the Jueying Lite3 model. It is designed for education and research purposes.

In October 2023, Deep Robotics launched the Jueying X30 upgrade model. It was the industry's first quadruped robot that operate in extreme temperatures from -20 °C to 55 °C. It was reported in January 2025 that Singapore Power Group would use a X30 to perform inspection of its power tunnels.

In August 2024, Deep Robotics unveiled and demonstrated its first humanoid robot DR01 at the 2024 World Robot Conference.

In November 2024, Deep Robotics unveiled its Lynx model. Although it was a quadruped robot like previous models, it swapped traditional pad feet for wheels which gave it flexibility to switch between humanoid and quadruped modes. This allowed it to navigate difficult terrains.

== See also ==
- Unitree Robotics
- List of robotic dogs
- Six Little Dragons
