= Xingxing (disambiguation) =

Xingxing or Xing Xing may refer to:

- Xing Xing Digital Corporation, Chinese animation studio
- Wang Xingxing (born 1990), Chinese roboticist
- Xing Xing, Tibetan macaque
- Xingxing Fox, Chinese cartoon series
