= Manycore =

Manycore may refer to:

- Manycore processor, special kinds of multi-core processors
- Manycore Tech, Chinese software company
