= AgiBot =

Chinese robotics company

AgiBot Innovation (Shanghai) Technology Co., Ltd
- Trade name: AgiBot
- Native name: 智元创新（上海）科技股份有限公司
- Type: Private
- Industry: Robotics
- Founded: February 2023; 3 years ago
- Founders: Deng Taihua and Peng Zhihui
- Headquarters: Shanghai, China
- Key people: Deng Taihua (CEO); Peng Zhihui (CTO)
- Products: Humanoid robots, embodied AI systems, robotic platforms
- Website: www.agibot.com

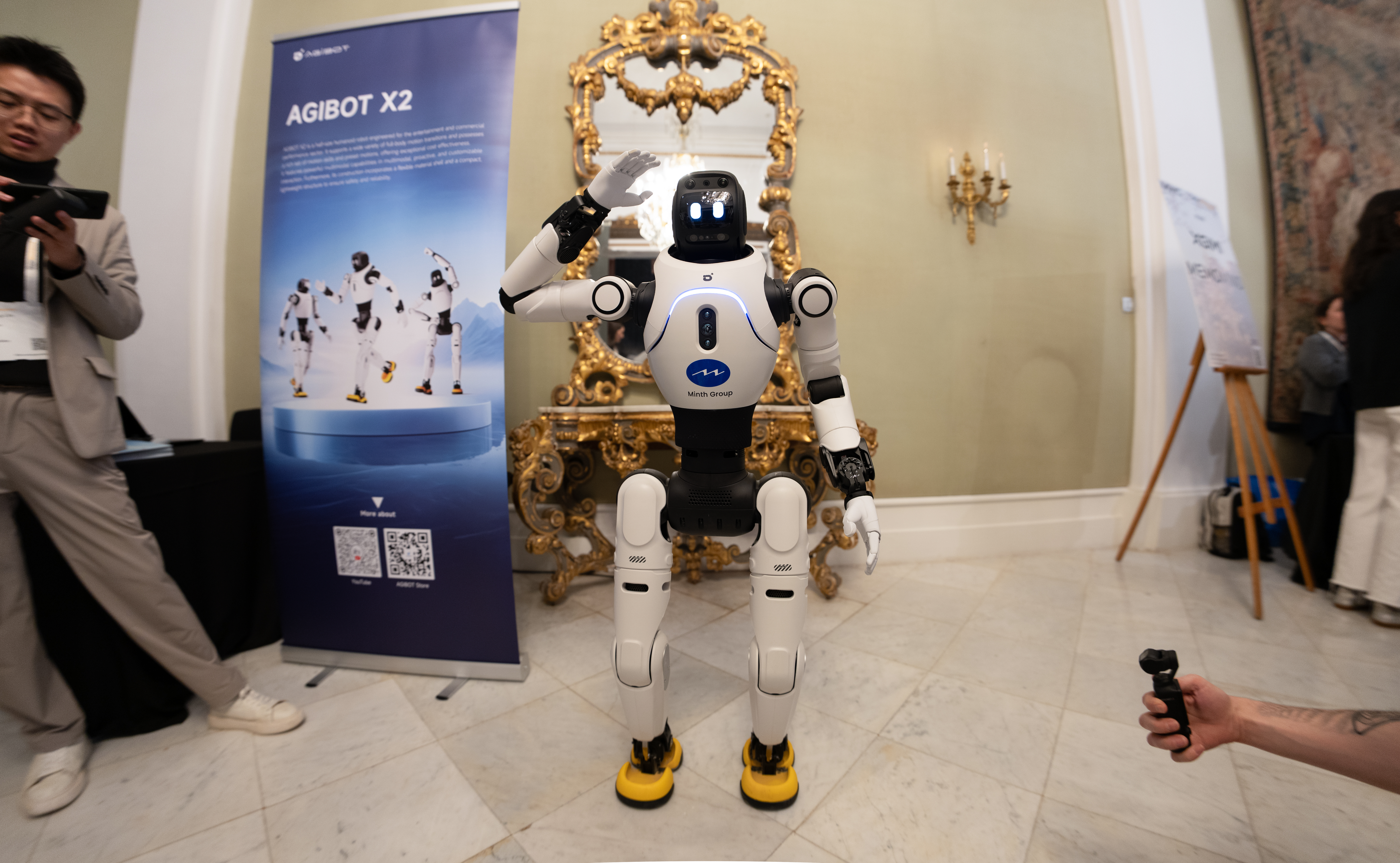
AgiBot X2 at MWC Barcelona 2026

AgiBot (also known as Zhiyuan Robotics; Chinese: 智元机器人; pinyin: Zhìyuán Jīqìrén) is a Chinese robotics company headquartered in Shanghai. Founded in 2023 by former Huawei engineers Deng Taihua and Peng Zhihui, the firm develops humanoid robots for industrial and service applications.

In December 2024, AgiBot said it had begun mass production. According to media reports, the firm stated it had produced 962 units as of December 15, 2024.

In November 2025, the AgiBot A2 robot was recognized by Guinness World Records for walking over 100 kilometres (62 miles).

== History ==
- 2019, Huawei initiated a programme known internally as "Top Minds" to attract top talent to the company. In 2020, Peng Zhihui joined Huawei as part of the programme to work on artificial intelligence (AI) projects. A graduate of the University of Electronic Science and Technology of China, he had developed a reputation for posting his inventions on Chinese social media which included an Iron Man-inspired robotic arm and a self-driving bicycle. Despite drawing a high annual salary of 2 million yuan (US$297,320), in December 2022 Peng announced on Bilibili that he was leaving Huawei to start a new endeavour.
- February 2023, Peng launched AgiBot. The company received backing from investors such as HSG, Hillhouse Investment, and BYD.
- January 2024, Agibot established its manufacturing facility in Shanghai.
- August 2024, The Paper reported AgiBot's first factory in Shanghai would reportedly start deliveries in October and ship 200 bipedal and 100 wheeled robots by the end of the year.
- September 2024, Agibot opened the 3,000+ square meter AIDEA Giga Data Factory.
- November 28, 2024, Senior Minister of Singapore Lee Hsien Loong visited AgiBot's Shanghai headquarters and observed a demonstration of its AgiBot A2.
- December 2024, AgiBot in a video stated that it had started mass production of its humanoid robots. The video also showcased the stages of its robotic production line at its Shanghai factory. AgiBot stated it was working on creating dexterous robots as well as advancing AI training so robots could be equipped to handle the world around them. As of December 15, 2024, AgiBot had manufactured 962 units.
- January 2025, The company produced its 1,000th general-purpose embodied robot.
- April 2025, during CCP General Secretary Xi Jinping's visit to Shanghai, AgiBot demonstrated its robots to him. He jokingly inquired whether robots would one day be able to play for the China national football team.
- March 2025, the first generalist embodied foundation model GO-1 introduced.
- May 2025, the humanoid obtained certification from China, the United States, and the European Union.
- July 2025, the first industrial deployment with continuous on-site operations was completed, alongside the release of the embodied intelligent operating system Lingqu OS.
- August 14, 2025, AgiBot introduced Genie Envisioner, a unified video generation platform designed for real-world applications and integrating capabilities in prediction, policy learning, and neural simulation.
- October 16, 2025, Agibot introduced the Agibot G2, an industrial-grade embodied robot. The G2 integrates high-performance actuators, force-controlled arms with full-arm torque sensing, and advanced spatial perception for use across manufacturing, logistics, and guided tour scenarios.
- October 27, 2025, AgiBot introduced LinkCraft, a zero-code platform for robot content creation that converts videos of human motion into precise humanoid robot actions, allowing users without programming skills to design and control robot performances by uploading simple videos.
- October 2025, Malaysian Sarawak Premier Datuk Patinggi Tan Sri Abang Johari Tun Openg visited the booth and observed the AgiBot X2 at the International Digital Economy Conference Sarawak 2025.
- November 2025, their A2 model walked 106.286 kilometres (66.043 miles), from Suzhou to Shanghai, in three days, entering the Guinness World Records for doing so.

== Products ==
=== History ===
In August 2023, AgiBot launched its first humanoid robot, RAISE A1 aimed at industrial applications doing tasks such as tasks like bolt tightening, vehicle inspections, and laboratory experiments. It is equipped with RGBD camera, Lidar sensors, and modular components to handle various scenarios. RAISE A1 stands at 1.75 metres (5 feet 9 inches) tall, weighs 53 kilograms (117 pounds) and has 49 degrees of freedom. it is capable of walking at speeds up to 7 km/h and handle loads up to 80 kg (180 lb). There are plans to expand RAISE A1's duties to perform household chores.

The second model listed on Agibot's website is the cleaning robot C5 which is designed to perform sweeping, scrubbing, and dust mopping together. It is equipped with functions such as automatic charging, automatic water filling and drainage, and self-cleaning of the sewage tank.

In August 2024, AgiBot introduced five new models of robots designed for various applications. They were three Yuanzheng models (A2, A2-Max and A2-W) and two Lingxi models (X1 and X1-W) At the center of the five robots shown was the Yuanzheng A2, a biped humanoid robot with a height of 1.75 m and weighing 55 kg. Built with various sensors and powered by AI it can see, hear and process information obtained. It was designed to perform tasks as delicate as inserting a thread through the eye of a needle. Another bipedal model Lingxi X1 would be open source and AgiBot would later publish most design material and codes to help more developers. Media reports compared them with Tesla's Optimus. AgiBot also introduced AIDEA, a comprehensive embodied AI data system for collecting and processing robot interaction data. AgiBot exhibited its robots at the 2024 World Robot Conference in Beijing.

At the end of 2024, AgiBot said it plans to allow public access to its robot database AgiBot World to achieve unified standards and reduce the unnecessary duplication of tasks during development. It claimed AgiBot World to be larger and of higher quality than Google's Open X-Embodiment which is the open source equivalent.

=== Product list ===
- A2
  - A2 Ultra
  - A2 Lite
  - A2-W
- X/D1
  - X1
  - X2
  - D1 Ultra
  - D1 Pro
- Genie
  - G2
  - G1
  - Data Service
- C5
- OmniHand
  - 2025
  - pro 2025
- VR
  - A2 VR Teleoperation Kit
- Premium Selection
  - DIGIT ROBOTICS
    - Summer swell S02
    - Summer start X02
    - Star hero P01

== Operations ==
According to Reuters, Shanghai authorities supported the establishment of an AgiBot data‑collection site where hundreds of robots are tele‑operated to generate training data for embodied‑AI models. The company also operates a factory in Shanghai that it said entered mass‑production preparation in 2024.

== See also ==
- Fourier
- UBtech Robotics
- Unitree Robotics
