= BrainCo =

Neurotechnology company headquartered in Hangzhou, China

BrainCo Inc.
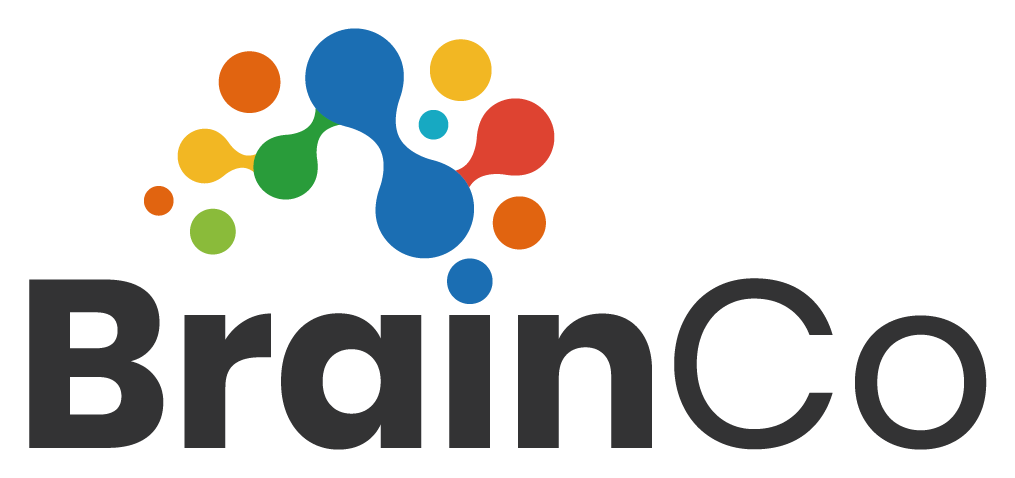
- Type: Private
- Industry: Neurotechnology
- Founded: 2015; 11 years ago
- Founder: Bicheng Han
- Headquarters: Hangzhou, Zhejiang, China
- Key people: Bicheng Han (CEO)
- Divisions: BrainRobotics; NeuroMaker STEM
- Website: brainco.tech

BrainCo Inc. is a neurotechnology company headquartered in Hangzhou, Zhejiang, China, with an office in Somerville, Massachusetts, United States. The company was founded by Bicheng Han, then a doctoral student at Harvard University, and was incubated at the Harvard Innovation Labs. BrainCo develops non-invasive brain–computer interface devices. The company is one of the Hangzhou technology firms known as the "Six Little Dragons", and filed for an initial public offering on the Hong Kong Stock Exchange in January 2026, after raising about 2 billion yuan (US$280 million).

== History ==
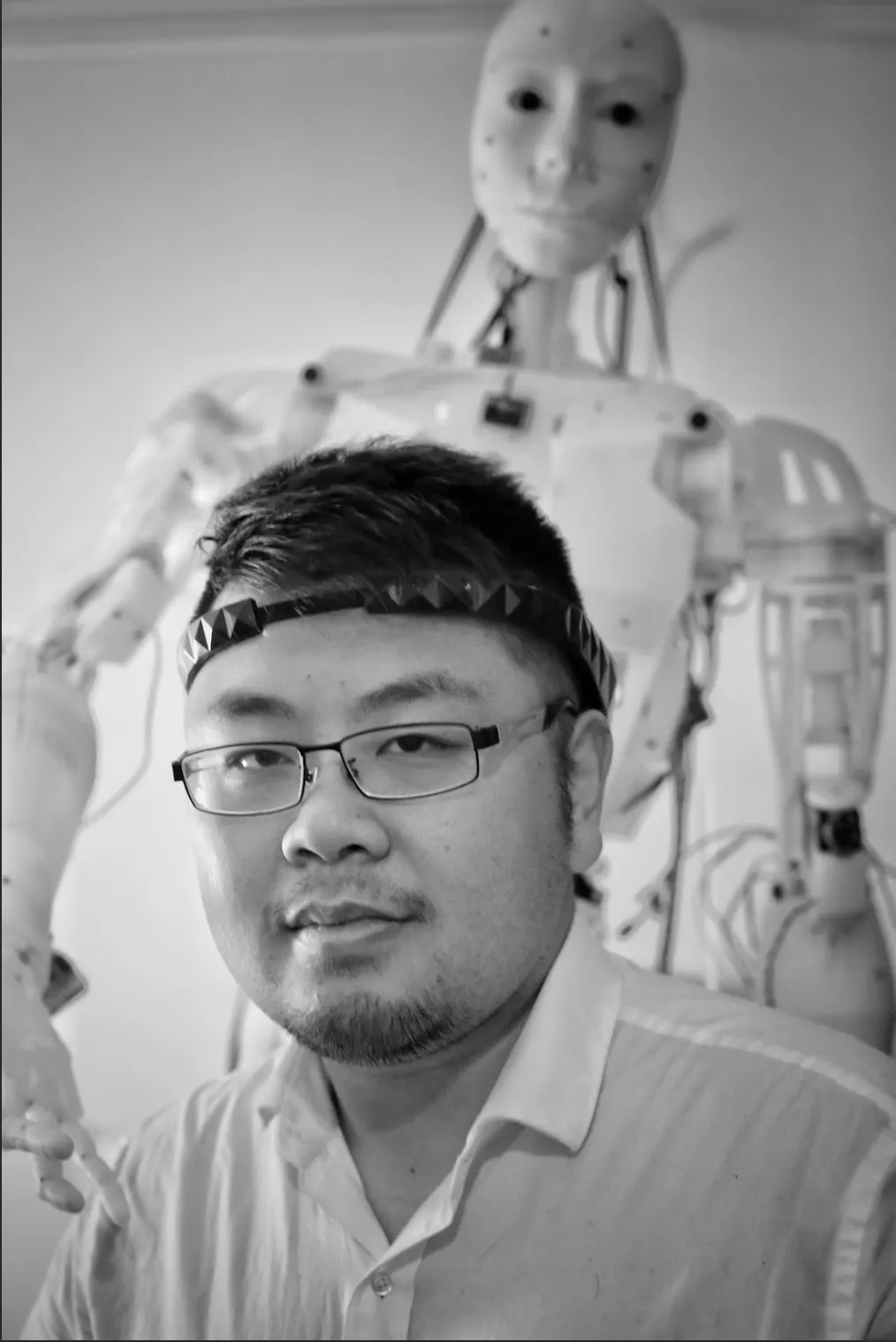
Bicheng Han

BrainCo was founded in 2015 in Somerville, Massachusetts by Bicheng Han while pursuing his PhD at the center for Brain Science at Harvard University. Han also founded BrainRobotics under BrainCo.

In 2016, BrainCo received US$5.5 million in seed funding to develop its first product: Focus 1. In 2017, it received another US$15 million in a funding round. James Edward Ryan also became an advisor to it.

In 2018, BrainCo established its headquarters in Hangzhou, Zhejiang province, while the Somerville office remained in operation.

In April, 2025 BrainCo reportedly considered an expansion into Hong Kong, and in August the company was reported to be in talks to raise funds at a valuation above US$1.3 billion ahead of a possible listing. In September 2025, BrainCo opened an Asia-Pacific headquarters at Cyberport in Hong Kong. It also drew scrutiny from Hunterbrook Media and Pablo Torre Finds Out for alleged ties to the Chinese government.

In January 2026 the company raised about 2 billion yuan (US$280 million) in a round co-led by IDG Capital, and filed confidentially for an initial public offering on the Hong Kong Stock Exchange, working with China International Capital Corporation and UBS.

== Product history ==
=== EEG headbands ===
In 2016, BrainCo unveiled Focus 1 product, a headband that aims to detect and report brain activity through electroencephalography (EEG). It was advertised to schools as Focus EDU where teachers can see if a student is paying attention based on EEG score. It initially received mixed reviews. It won several awards including "Most Innovative" at the 2017 International Society for Technology in Education national conference. At the 2016 CES conference, the Focus 1 device failed during a live demo and received criticism from The Daily Dot. Later at the 2017 CES conference, the live demo was successful.

In April 2019, a post on Weibo showed Focus headbands being worn by pupils at an undisclosed primary school in China. It attracted criticism for being seen as constantly monitoring children as part of mass surveillance. BrainCo issued a statement stating that headbands were used in a number of school trials in China to help children improve learning efficiency and had not been sold to any public school. The company also clarified that the attention index displayed group averages rather than individual student data, with teachers using the scores to evaluate the appeal of their lessons. Despite the controversy, BrainCo had already secured a two-year contract to get its Focus 1 device manufactured and targeted shipments of 600,000 units. In November 2019, it was reported that the school trials were halted in China amid parents’ privacy concerns and fears they could be used to control the children. In September 2020, the development and promotion of the Focus headbands earned BrainCo one of the annual German Big Brother Awards, criticising the company as one of that year’s worst offenders against personal privacy.

By 2021, the product had been rebranded as FocusCalm, aimed to help users relax. BBC reported that the headband was used by athletes to train focus and manage stress.

On November 7, 2022, BrainCo released Eassleep, a headband used for sleep purposes.

In October 2024, BrainCo released OxyZen which monitors heart rate, blood oxygen and brain waves to provide tailored meditation and sleep.

=== Prosthetic limbs ===
At the 2020 CES conference, BrainCo unveiled the final model of its BrainRobotics prosthetic hand with the product being launched on the market that year. The prosthetic hands read an amputee’s neural and muscular electrical signals and translate intended finger movements into finger motions. Time Magazine named it as one of the top 100 inventions of 2019. The technology was undergoing FDA testing and given out to volunteers for trials, which allowed them to successfully perform basic actions, such as using computer peripherals.

BrainCo is also developing prosthetic legs which were demonstrated in 2021.

In May 2026, BrainCo partnered with Hong Kong Polytechnic University in a pilot two-year program to provide smart prosthetic limbs to 60 eligible amputees, funded by Hong Kong Innovation and Technology Fund.

=== Brain-controlled robotic AI platform ===
During the 2026 World Artificial Intelligence Conference, the company presented what it claims to be the world's first brain-to-robot controlled AI platform. The device uses an EEG headset to capture neural signals, decoded by AI algorithms and translated into commands for a connected robot in under 200 milliseconds; supported robotics include third-party humanoid robots, robotic arms and robotic dogs. During the same event, BrainCo also introduced an embodied AI solution for data collection, said to address the shortage of quality training data used for robotic AI development.

== See also ==
- Brain–computer interface
- Neuralink
- Six Little Dragons
