= Six Little Dragons =

Informal group of Chinese tech startups

Six Little Dragons (Chinese: 杭州六小龙), or Six Little Dragons of Hangzhou, are an informal grouping of the tech startups Game Science, DeepSeek, Unitree Robotics, DEEP Robotics, BrainCo and Manycore Tech. All six were established in Hangzhou. They are active in tech fields such as artificial intelligence, robotics, gaming, and brain-computer interface technology. Hangzhou is referred to as the China's "e-commerce capital" (电商之都). The nickname "Six Little Dragons" originated from the Chinese internet.

== Background ==
=== Chinese government investments (2002 — 2010s) ===
From 2002 to 2007, under Xi Jinping's leadership as party secretary of Zhejiang, provincial spending on technology research grew over four times to 28 billion RMB. The province launched "Digital Zhejiang" (数字浙江) to advance modernization and the "Eight Eight Strategy" (八八战略), focusing on eight advantages and actions to boost industrial development, including specialized industries. In 2010, Hangzhou's government started "Project Eagle" (雏鹰计划) to aid science and technology startups. The project works with incubators and accelerators to find promising tech companies and offers public funding and other help, especially for startups by graduates and returning students. Unitree received support in the initial phase, along with government subsidies from Binjiang District.

=== AI-startups and further investments (2025 — present) ===
In January 2025, the Chinese government created the "Hangzhou AI Industry Chain High-Quality Development Action Plan" which focuses on computing power, LLM technologies, and AI applications. The plan was made to certify over 2,000 new high-tech enterprises, initiate over 300 major tech projects, and invest more than 300 billion RMB (US$40 billion) annually. The Chinese government also renewed "Project Eagle" and to allocate 15% of industrial policy funds for future industries.

Hangzhou aimed to become a center for tech startups, highlighting the "six little dragons of Hangzhou," a nickname popularized in early 2025. This group includes DeepSeek, Game Science, Unitree Robotics, Manycore Tech, BrainCo, and DEEP Robotics, companies in gaming, robotics, and software development. Earlier in 2025, DeepSeek, one of the six dragons, launched an AI system at a much lower cost than those from Silicon Valley. Since then, DeepSeek and Alibaba have produced top-performing open source AI models. Game Science launched the successful video game Black Myth: Wukong in 2024, while Unitree gained attention for their dancing robots in the 2025 annual spring gala broadcast by Chinese state media.

The group was acknowledged by Chinese authorities in Hangzhou in a New Years message for local businesses in January 2025. Hangzhou's universities were given credit for the development of Chinese technological industry. Zhejiang University alumni founded three of the "Six Little Dragons". By September 2024, the university produced 102 executives in Chinese AI start-ups, ranking third among China's top institutions.

On February 20, 2025, Alibaba's Eddie Wu stated that the company would focus on artificial generative intelligence and plans significant investment in AI. The company also sought to boost foreign investment to China's "Six Little Dragons" following Alibaba's founder Jack Ma attended General Secretary of the Chinese Communist Party Xi Jinping's business symposium with corporate leaders and entrepreneurs that same month.

== Challenges ==
China's net foreign direct investment (FDI) fell by US$168 billion in 2024, marking the largest capital flight since 1990. Foreign investment peaked at US$344 billion in 2021 but has since declined according to the State Administration of Foreign Exchange. In 2024, foreign investors put in only US$4.5 billion while Chinese firms invested US$173 billion abroad. According to interviews conducted by The New York Times, some start-up company founders believe that Chinese government's support for Hangzhou's technological sector has deterred foreign investors.

Tensions with the United States led many international companies to adopt a China Plus One strategy, while Chinese firms build factories overseas to avoid potential Trump tariffs. China also faced US restrictions on its access of advanced chips, forcing Chinese tech companies to stockpile Nvidia chips while Chinese producers like Huawei and Semiconductor Manufacturing International Corporation (SMIC) were competing to produce their own.

== See also ==
- Six AI tigers
- FAANG
- Silicon Valley
- List of technology centers
- Four Asian Tigers
