= Degrees of freedom =

Number of independent parameters of a system

In many scientific fields, the degrees of freedom of a system is the number of parameters of the system that may vary independently. For example, a point in the plane has two degrees of freedom for translation: its two coordinates; a non-infinitesimal object on the plane might have additional degrees of freedoms related to its orientation. Another example is the hand having 27 independent degrees of freedom.

In mathematics, this notion is formalized as the dimension of a manifold or an algebraic variety. When degrees of freedom is used instead of dimension, this usually means that the manifold or variety that models the system is only implicitly defined. See:

- Degrees of freedom (mechanics), number of independent motions that are allowed to the body or, in case of a mechanism made of several bodies, number of possible independent relative motions between the pieces of the mechanism
- Degrees of freedom (physics and chemistry), a term used in explaining dependence on parameters, or the dimensions of a phase space
- Degrees of freedom (statistics), the number of values in the final calculation of a statistic that are free to vary
- Degrees of freedom problem, the problem of controlling motor movement given abundant degrees of freedom

== See also ==
- Six degrees of freedom
