= Fourier (company) =

Chinese robotics company

- Native name: 上海傅利叶智能科技有限公司
- Formerly: Fourier Intelligence
- Type: Private
- Industry: Robotics; Healthcare
- Founded: 2015; 11 years ago
- Founders: Alex Gu; Zen Koh
- Headquarters: Shanghai, China
- Key people: Alex Gu (CEO)
- Website: www.fftai.cn

Fourier (Chinese: 傅利叶; pinyin: Fùlìyè) is Chinese robotics company headquartered in Shanghai.

Originally focused on rehabilitation robotics, the company has also expanded into developing humanoid robots.

== Background ==
Fourier was founded in 2015 by Alex Gu. Gu graduated from Shanghai Jiao Tong University and was previously a sales executive at National Instruments. The company's name was named after Joseph Fourier and was set up in Zhangjiang Town with the aim of physical rehab purposes.

Fourier is backed by investors such as IDG Capital and Saudi Aramco.

By 2019, Fourier had brought its intelligent rehab devices such as exoskeletons into hundreds of hospitals and medical care centres in over 10 countries and became an established player in the industry. Gu had long dreamt of creating his own humanoid robot and during that year, Fourier launched a new venture to develop humanoid robots.

In June 2020, Fourier acquired Zhuhai RHK Healthcare (RHK), a rehab services provider that serves over 200 hospitals across China. The acquisition of RHK would give Fourier access to a bigger customer base and more data feedback as well as helping develop an ecosystem around Fourier's rehab technology. One of the hurdles that Fourier encountered was the expensive price tag of its products. The high cost of its products would partly be mitigated through the acquisition of RHK that offered rehab services to community hospitals which were trying to meet the growing demand for tech-driven physiotherapy. RHK was also involved in medical equipment leasing and financing which would provide Fourier with marketing support to tap budge and staff constrained hospitals in lower-tier cities.

In December 2023, Chinese leader Xi Jinping met Fourier's leaders on an inspection tour in Shanghai. Xi had asked whether it was possible to talk to the bipedal robot and get it to perform basic tasks. This was seen as a sign that the Chinese government had interest an in robotics.

== Product history ==
Fourier originally focused on developing robotics to help people with physical disabilities caused by neurological impairment regain movements.

On 20 March 2017, Fourier unveiled Fourier X1, a walking assisting exoskeleton.

On 21 January 2019, Fourier launched The Fourier Exoskeleton & Robotics Open Platform (EXOPS) which was developed in collaboration with National Instruments. It is an Android-like open platform system used for development of exoskeletons.

In 2019, Fourier started work on developing its first humanoid robot model GR-1 which was born in a small laboratory on the first floor of the Fourier headquarters. A major milestone was reached in 2022 when a 1.65-meter GR-1 model was able to rise up on both legs and walk. Fourier published a video of it walking which received mixed responses as some overseas audience thought the video was computer-generated. In July 2023, the GR-1 was unveiled at the World Artificial Intelligence Conference in Shanghai which attracted significant attention. At this point the GR-1 had already been delivered in small quantities to some universities and AI companies for research and development. Plans were made to begin mass production by the end of 2023 and to deliver thousands of units in 2024. In June 2024, it was reported GR-1 was now equipped with a vision system that enables real-time mapping, navigation, and obstacle avoidance with human-like precision.

In November 2023, Fourier launched MetaMotus™ Galileo, a biomechanics analysis and rehab platform, which integrates both virtual reality and robotics.

At the end of September 2024, Fourier unveiled the GR-2 model which was an upgrade of the GR-1. It stood at 1.75 meters, weighed 63 kg, had 53 degrees of freedom and a 3 kg single-arm load capacity. It has a silver-gray body, accented by black joints and a functional purple belt. GR-2 was equipped with a detachable battery and could perform more complex tasks. The software development kit had also been improved.

== Products ==
- GRx series
  - GR-1
  - GR-2
- GR-3 series
  - GR-3 Kitty head
  - GR-3C Astronaut

== See also ==
- AgiBot
- UBtech Robotics
- Unitree Robotics
