= Manycore Tech =

Chinese software company

Manycore Tech Inc.
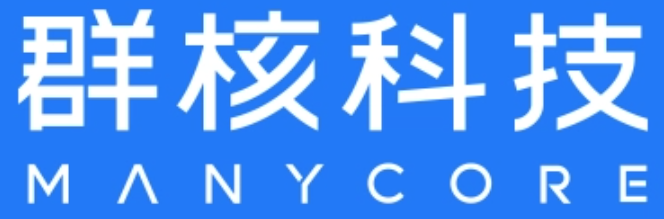
- Native name: 杭州群核信息技术有限公司
- Type: Public
- Traded as: SEHK: 68
- Industry: Information technology
- Founded: 9 November 2011; 14 years ago
- Founders: Huang Xiaohuang; Chen Hang; Zhu Hao
- Headquarters: Hangzhou, Zhejiang, China
- Key people: Huang Xiaohuang (Chairman); Chen Hang (CEO)
- Products: Kujiale; Coohom; SpatialVerse
- Revenue: ▲CN¥663.54 million (2023)
- Net income: ▲CN¥−646.10 million (2023)
- Total assets: ▼CN¥766.08 million (2023)
- Total equity: ▼CN¥3.33 billion (2023)
- Website: www.kujiale.com

Manycore Tech Inc. (Manycore; Chinese: 群核科技; pinyin: Qúnhé Kējì) is a Chinese software company that develops spatial design software. Its main CAD platform is Kujiale, which has an international version called Coohom.

According to Frost & Sullivan, in 2023 Manycore was the world's largest spatial design platform by average monthly active users and the largest software provider in China's spatial design industry by revenue.

== Background ==
Manycore was founded in 2011 by three graduates of the University of Illinois Urbana-Champaign. Investors of the company included IDG Capital, Hillhouse Investment and Coatue Management.

In 2013, Manycore launched its flagship product Kujiale which allows users to create 3D renderings of home interior layouts. Kujiale uses the software as a service model that relies on cloud computing to provide users with computing power and rendering services.

In 2018, Manycore launched Coohom which was the international version of Kujiale.

In 2021, Manycore applied for an initial public offering (IPO) on the Nasdaq, but ultimately did not proceed.

On 20 November 2024, Manycore launched SpatialVerse, a spatial intelligence platform for artificial intelligence development in indoor environments.

On 14 February 2025, Manycore filed for an IPO on the Hong Kong Stock Exchange. On 17 April 2026, Manycore completed its IPO.

== See also ==
- Six Little Dragons
