= Unitree Robotics =

Chinese robotics company

Hangzhou Yushu Technology Co., Ltd.

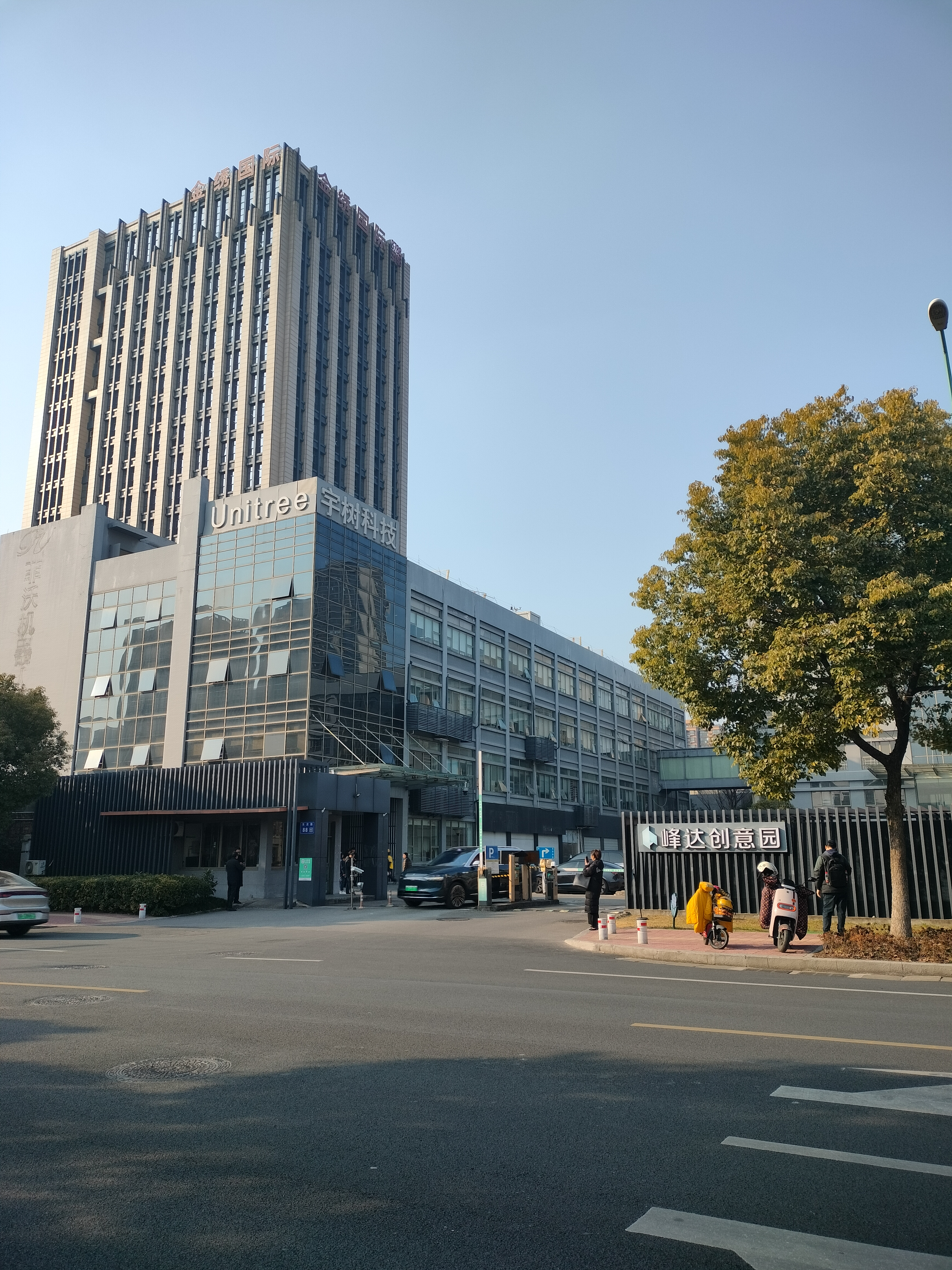
- Headquarters in Hangzhou
- Trade name: Unitree Robotics
- Native name: 杭州宇树科技有限公司
- Romanized name: Hángzhōu yǔ shù kējì yǒuxiàn gōngsī
- Type: Public
- Traded as: SSE: 688836
- Industry: Robotics; Artificial intelligence; Automation
- Founded: 26 August 2016; 10 years ago
- Founder: Wang Xingxing
- Headquarters: Hangzhou, Zhejiang, China
- Key people: Wang Xingxing (CEO)
- Products: Quadrupedal and humanoid robots
- Revenue: 1,700,000,000 renminbi (2025)
- Net income: 288,000,000 renminbi (2025)
- Number of employees: 500 (2025)
- Website: unitree.com

Unitree Robotics
- Simplified Chinese: 杭州宇树科技有限公司
Transcriptions

Hangzhou Yushu Technology Co., Ltd., doing business as Unitree Robotics, is a robotics company based in Hangzhou, China. Founded by Wang Xingxing in August 2016, Unitree initially specialized in quadruped robots for the consumer market. In 2024, the company began producing humanoid robots, with the second iteration priced around US$16,000.

== History ==
In 2013, Wang Xingxing developed quadrupeds during his postgraduate studies at Shanghai University. On 26 August 2016, Wang Xingxing registered and established "Hangzhou Unitree Technology Co., Ltd." in a 50-square-metre (540 sq ft) office in Binjiang District, Hangzhou. His first quadruped device, XDog, was developed in 2016 for his master's thesis. The robotic dog became an Internet sensation which attracted buyers and investors. After Wang started to work at the Chinese company DJI, he decided to resign and start his own company, Unitree.

In 2021, Unitree released Unitree Go1, a quadruped robot similar to Boston Dynamics' Spot. It is fitted with 12 motors; each can generate a maximum torque of 23.7 N⋅m (17.5 lbf⋅ft) and can spin at speeds of up to 30 rad/s (about 280 rpm). According to an article by The Wall Street Journal, the Unitree robotic dog can navigate in different surfaces including sand, rocks, and soil.

In April 2024, Unitree released a video of its humanoid robot H1. In August 2024, Unitree released the G1, an upgraded version of the H1, for mass production at a price point of about US$16,000. The G1 utilizes a configuration of 23 to 43 permanent magnet synchronous motor (PMSM) rotary joint actuators capable of peak knee torque ratings between 90 N.m and 120 N.m depending on the variant. The machine was designed for users to participate in robotics research and optionally share data with a network allowing the robot to learn new automated services. The G1 has gained recognition as the basis of robot's interacting with the public that are puppeted by remote operators, examples being the Polish “Edward Warchocki” and the American “Rizzbot”.

In April 2025, the South China Morning Post reported that Unitree was exploring the possibility of holding an initial public offering (IPO) in Hong Kong. The company had previously received investment from venture capital funds such as HSG, Matrix Partners, and Shunwei Capital. In July 2025, the company began its IPO tutoring process with CITIC Securities. In March 2026, it filed for an initial IPO to list on the Shanghai Stock Exchange. Major shareholders include the National Social Security Fund, CNPC Kunlun, DeepSeek, China Southern Power Grid, and Tianyi Capital, as well as affiliates of Tencent, Meituan, Alibaba and Ant Group.

According to Unitree's responses to the Shanghai Stock Exchange listing inquiry, about 73.6% of its humanoid-related revenue in the first three quarters of 2025 came from research and education customers, with 9.0% from industrial applications.

In August 2026, the company demonstrated a humanoid robot dubbed "Superman" that could run up to 12.66 metres per second (28.3 miles per hour), faster than Jamaican sprinter Usain Bolt, and jump 2 m (6 1/2 feet) from a standing position.

== Products ==
=== 2013 to 2016 ===
==== XDog ====
prototype quadruped robotic dog using custom motor drive boards, leg structures, and control architecture

=== 2021 ===
==== Go1 ====
lightweight, consumer-level quadruped robot dog

- Weight & Size: ~12 kg; dimensions roughly 58.8 cm long and 22 cm tall.
- Payload: Can carry about 3 to 5 kg.
- Sensors: Equipped with 5 sets of fisheye stereo depth-sensing cameras and ultrasonic sensors for obstacle avoidance and person tracking.

Had a security vulnerability known as CVE-2025-2894

=== 2023 ===
Go2, H1, B2

=== 2024 ===
==== G1 ====
Affordable, mid-sized agile humanoid robot. Standing roughly 4'2" (1.27 m) tall and weighing 35 kg, it features 23 to 43 degrees of freedom, RealSense depth camera, and a basic MediaTek processor.

- Dimensions: ~127 cm tall, ~35 kg weight
- Joints (Degrees of Freedom): 23 (standard) up to 43 (EDU/Ultimate versions with extended waist and arm articulation)
- Sensing: RealSense depth camera (3D LiDAR, 4-microphone array), and built-in speaker
- Power: Quick-release 9000 mAh battery providing roughly 2 hours of runtime
- Compute: Optional extra processors include NVIDIA Jetsons

=== 2025 ===
R1, A2, H2

=== 2026 ===
==== As2 ====
40-pound robot dog hits 11 mph, carries 143 pounds

==== As2-W ====
hybrid wheel-legged version

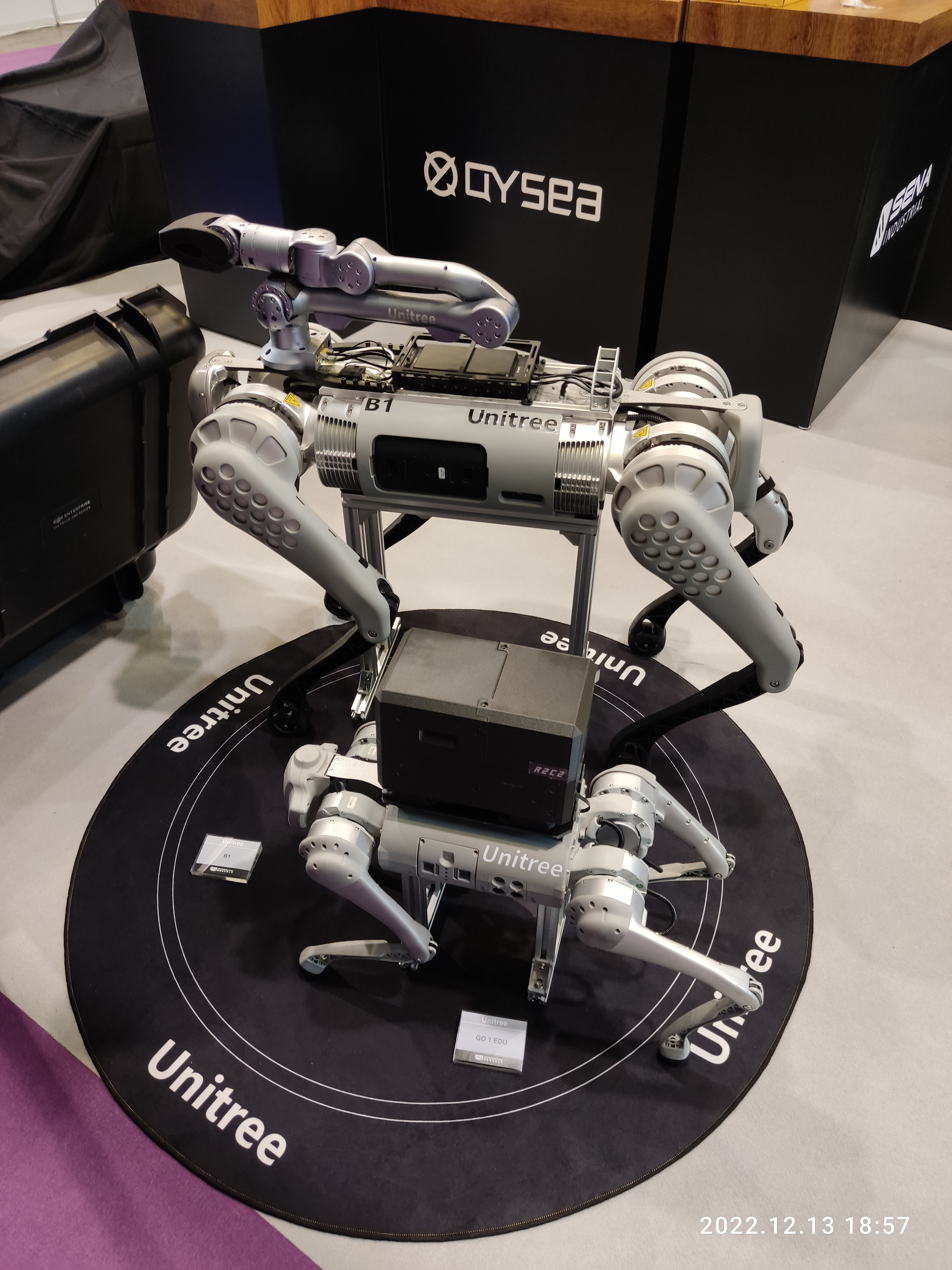
Unitree B1 (top) and Go1

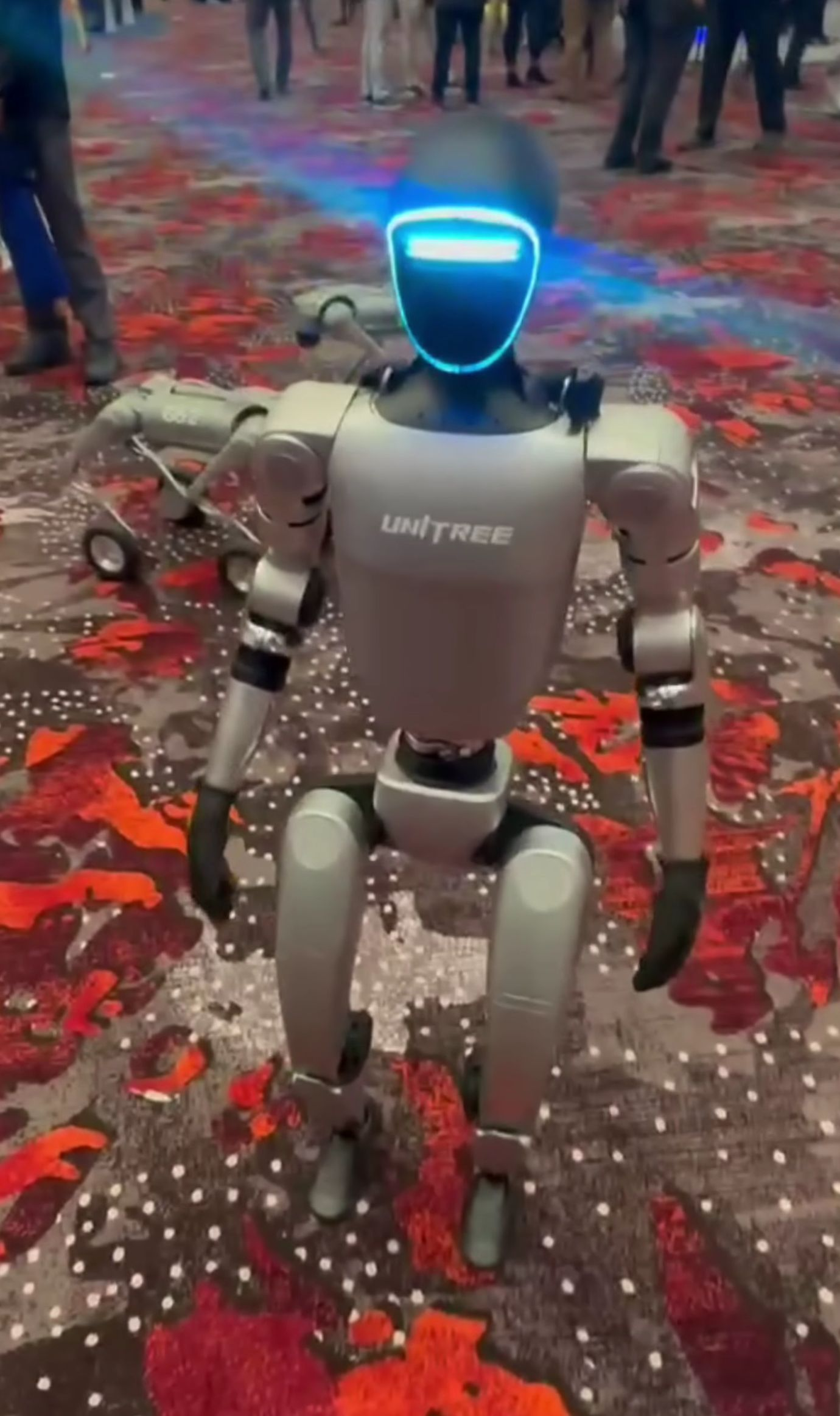
Unitree G1

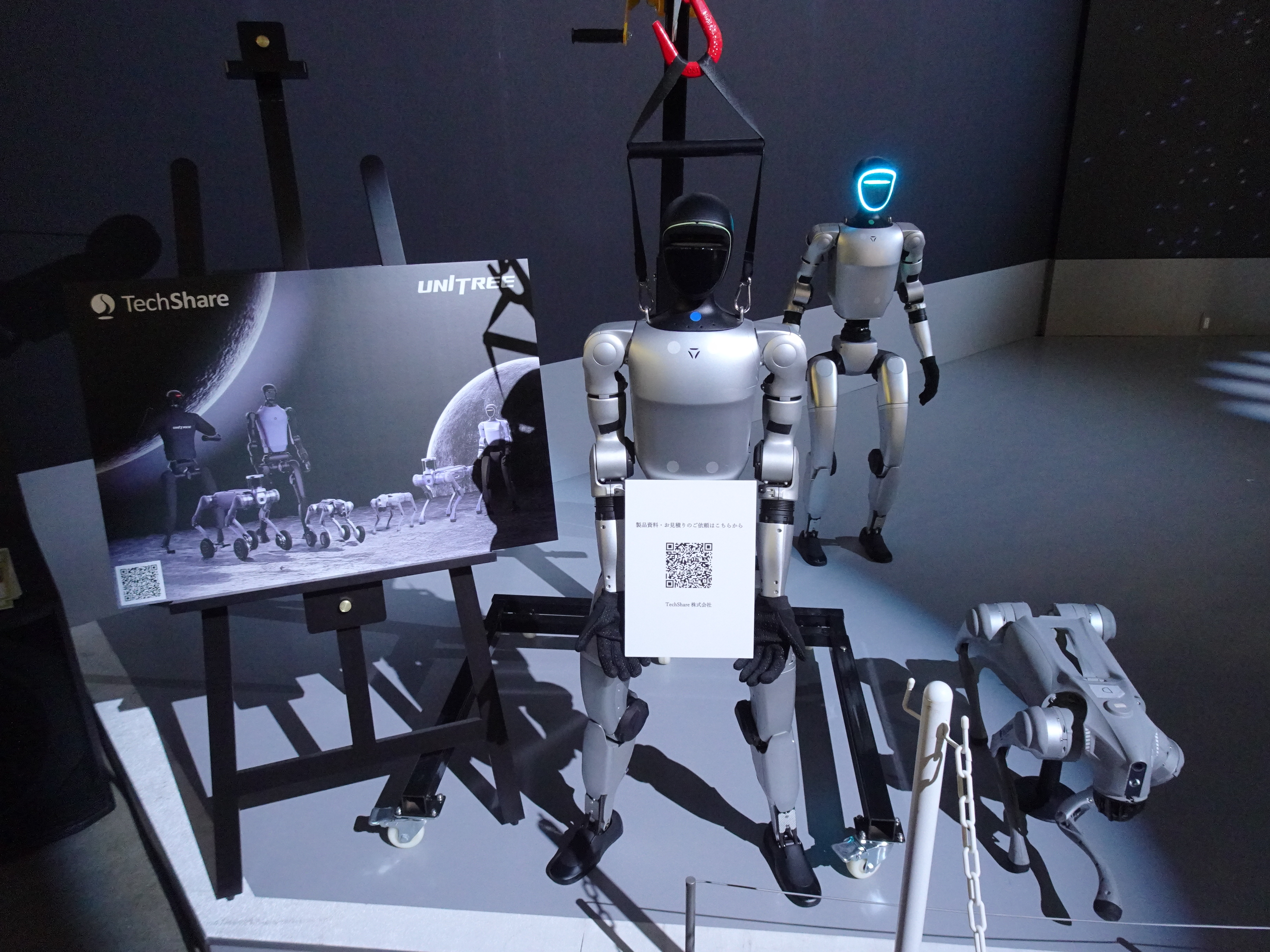
Humanoid and quadruped robots

== Awards ==
In July 2025, the company was one of the winners of the WIPO Global Awards, awarded by the World Intellectual Property Organization in the category of information and communications technology for small and medium enterprises.

== Controversies ==
=== Use by the military ===
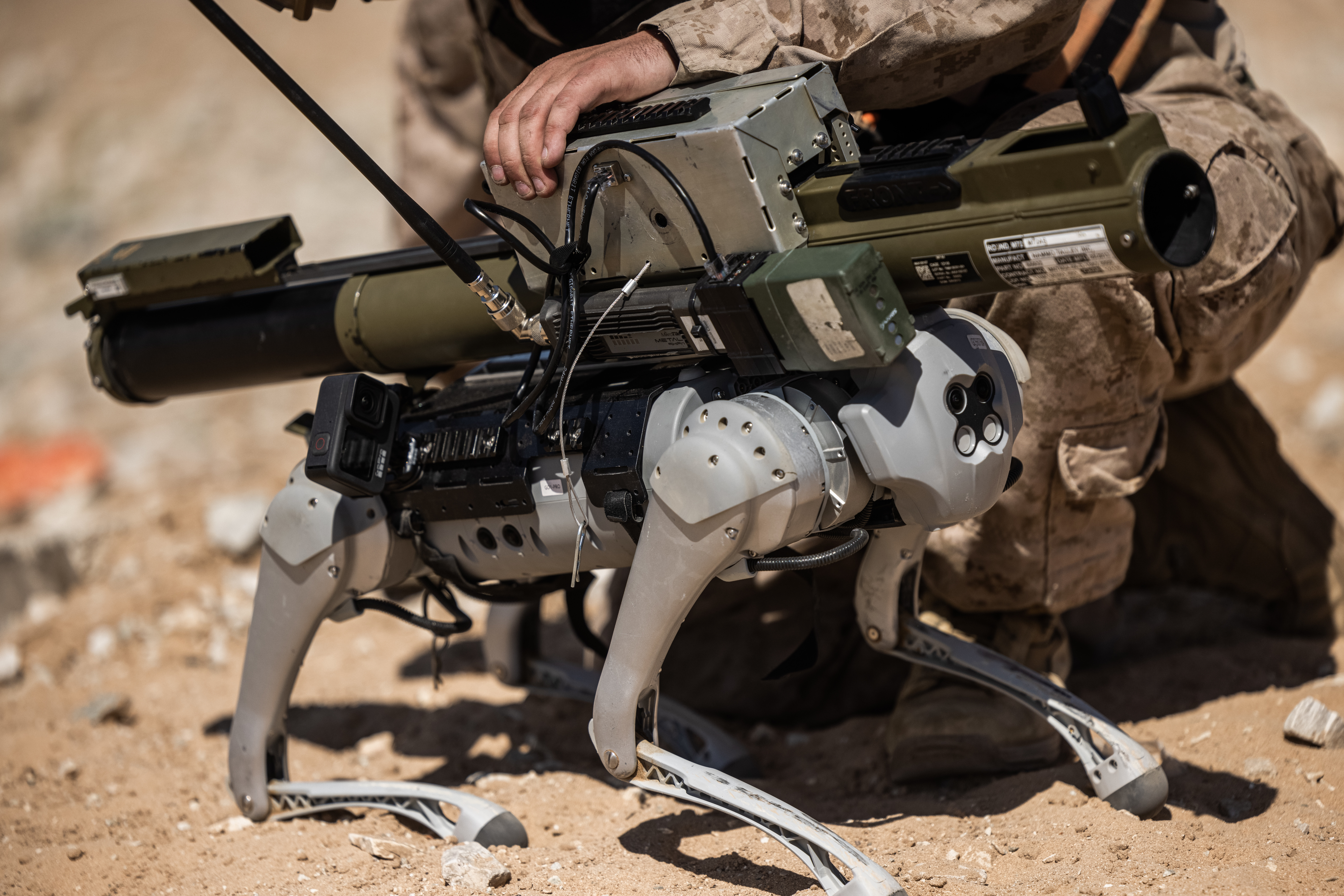
United States Marine Corps test fire the M72 LAW mounted on a Unitree robot (2023)

In August 2022, Unitree denied allegations about reports of their Go1 robot being used by the Russian Armed Forces.

In September 2023, the United States Marine Corps used an M72 LAW anti-tank rocket launcher fixed to a Go1 robotic dog during tactical training at the Marine Corps Air Ground Combat Center Twentynine Palms in California.

In May 2024, The Guardian reported the Unitree Go2 robot has been used during China's joint military drills with Cambodia, with an automatic rifle on its back. According to the newspaper, this was based on footage broadcast by China Central Television. Unitree, in the same month, stated they do not sell their products to the People's Liberation Army.

In May 2025, the US House Select Committee on China requested the Federal Communications Commission, the US Department of Commerce, and the US Department of Defense to investigate Unitree regarding its alleged connections with the People's Liberation Army and its military–civil fusion programs. In June 2026, the US Department of Defense added Unitree to a list of Chinese military-linked companies.

=== Security ===
In April 2025, security researchers alleged Unitree had put backdoors into their products that allowed the company to remotely access Unitree devices and even other devices on the same network. Unitree responded by denying that it was an intentional backdoor, and claiming it was a vulnerability that has since been fixed.

In September 2025, security researchers revealed the Unitree G1 Humanoid robot collects data and reports multi-modal sensor data without notifying the operator and could be used in an offensive cyber attack given weaknesses in its security. Also in September 2025, the same security researchers published a wormable vulnerability that allows an attacker in close proximity to gain full control of Unitree's Go2 and B2 quadrupeds and G1 and H1 humanoids (over BLE). Infected robots would in turn be able to compromise other robots nearby. As of 29 September 2025, Unitree has declined to comment.

== See also ==
- AgiBot
- Boston Dynamics
- Fourier
- Six Little Dragons
- UBtech Robotics
