= Wang Xingxing =

Chinese roboticist and entrepreneur (born 1990)

- 王兴兴
- Wang in 2026
- Born: 1990 (age 35–36); Ningbo, Zhejiang, China
- Education: Zhejiang Sci-Tech University (BEng); Shanghai University (MEng)
- Known for: Founder and CEO of Unitree Robotics

Wang Xingxing (Chinese: 王兴兴; pinyin: Wáng Xìngxìng; born 1990) is a Chinese roboticist and entrepreneur. He is the founder, chief executive, and chief technology officer of Unitree Robotics, a Hangzhou-based developer of quadrupedal and humanoid robots founded in 2016.

== Early life and education ==
Wang was born in 1990 in Ningbo, Zhejiang, China.

In 2009, Wang enrolled at Zhejiang Sci-Tech University, majoring in mechatronics engineering. As a first-year student, he built his first small bipedal robot using only about ¥200 (approximately US$30) worth of parts and hand-crafted components. Wang's graduation thesis focused on the development of a brushless DC motor controller.

In 2013, Wang enrolled at Shanghai University to pursue a master's degree in mechatronics engineering. In 2015, Wang spent around 20,000 yuan developing a prototype quadruped robot named XDog for his graduation thesis. Wang graduated in 2016.

== Career ==
In 2016, Wang joined drone maker DJI. However, he resigned after two months to start Unitree Robotics. In a 2021 interview with KrAsia, Wang shared that during the firm's first three years it at times struggled to meet payroll, and that by late 2018 it began generating revenue and attracted additional investment.

According to Wang in 2021, he stated Boston Dynamics isn't a direct competitor since although its robots are more capable in functionality, its product lifecycle is much longer and slower than Unitree Robotics. In addition Unitree Robotics aims at individual consumers segment and has a much cheaper product offering. However, Wang considers Marc Raibert his idol.

In January 2025, Wang made headlines when he was seated in the front row at Xi Jinping's high-profile business symposium which was attended by representatives of China's leading companies. He was the youngest among the group sitting in the front row.

In 2025, Time included Wang in its TIME100 AI list of influential people in artificial intelligence.
