= UBtech Robotics =

Chinese manufacturer of robots

UBtech Robotics Inc.
- Type: Public
- Traded as: SEHK: 9880
- ISIN: CNE100006CQ4
- Industry: Robotics
- Founded: March 31, 2012; 14 years ago China
- Founder: Zhou Jian
- Headquarters: Shenzhen, China
- Key people: Zhou Jian (CEO)
- Revenue: ▲CN¥1.06 billion (2023)
- Net income: ▼CN¥−1.27 billion (2023)
- Total assets: ▲CN¥4.77 billion (2023)
- Total equity: ▲CN¥2.09 billion (2023)
- Number of employees: 2,013 (2023)
- Website: ubtrobot.com

UBtech Robotics Inc. (深圳市優必選科技股份有限公司) is a Chinese manufacturer of robots based in Shenzhen, Guangdong.

== History ==
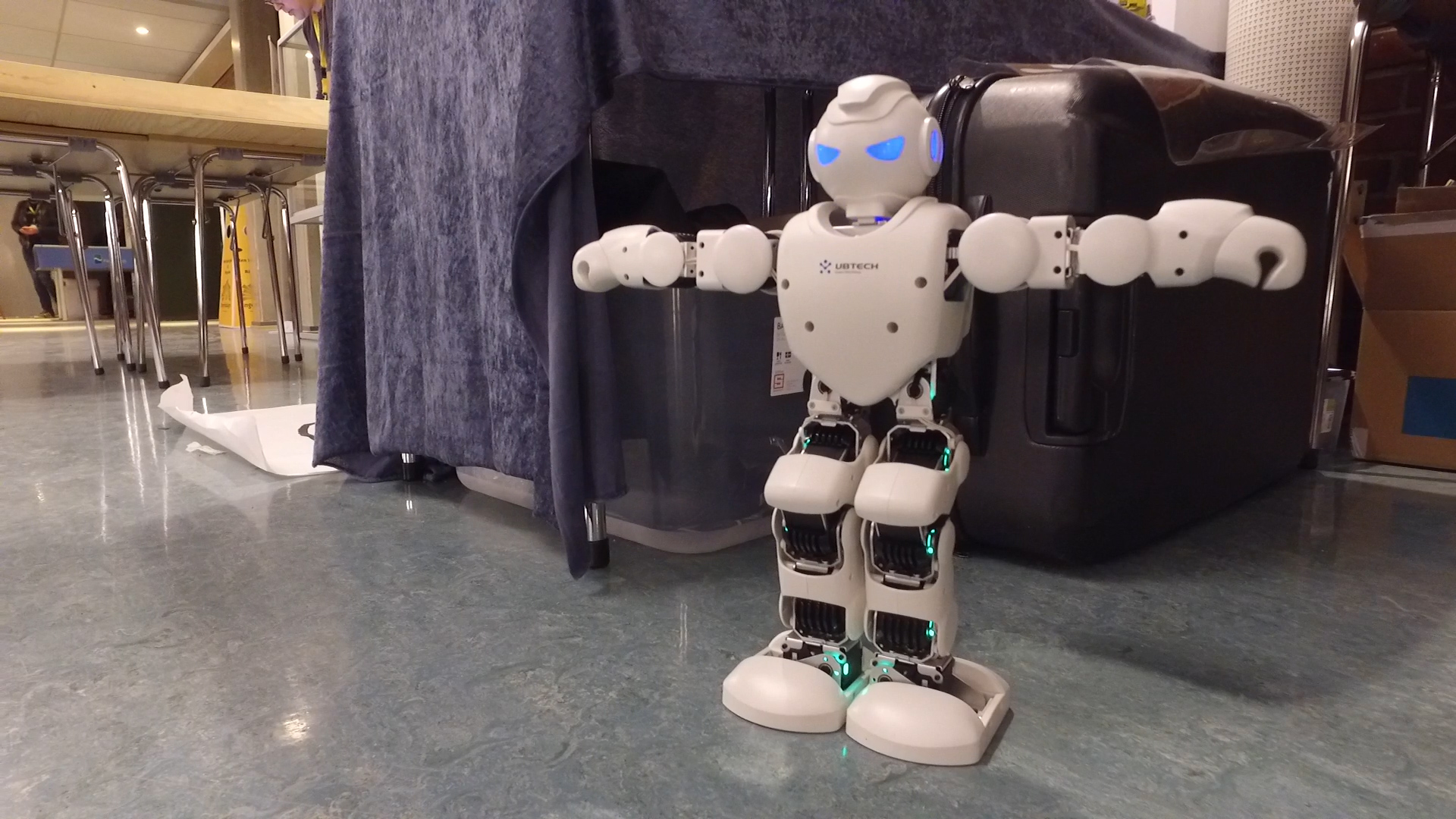
UBtech Alpha 1PRO humanoid robot

Ubtech was founded in 2012 by Zhou Jian. Ubtech specializes in humanoid robots. Ubtech exhibited at IFA Berlin in 2017 and showed its latest innovations.

In 2018, the Italian mobile communications provider Telecom Italia Mobile set a Guinness world record for simultaneous dance for robots with 1,372 Alpha S1 robots from Ubtech. The old record was 1,069 robots. In 2020 its robots were used to help medical workers treating COVID-19 patients in Shenzhen.

After a Series-C funding round by Tencent and ICBC, it was valued at $5 billion. It was planning an IPO as of 2019.

In December 2021, the company delivered pint-sized robots to 300 pre-schools in Seoul, South Korea.

In January 2022, Ubtech launched a mobile robot that emits UV rays to disinfect. The robot was commercially launched in the United States.

The company held its initial public offering (IPO) in December 2023, raising HK$1 billion on the Hong Kong Stock Exchange.

In October 2024, UBTECH launched the Walker S Series, including the Walker S1 and Walker S Lite models, aimed at industrial applications. The Walker S Lite, in particular, is designed for intelligent manufacturing and smart logistics, featuring lightweight construction and rapid deployment capabilities.

In February 2026, the company open-sourced its self-developed vision-language model "Thinker".
