= All Nighter =

All Nighter or Allnighter may refer to:

- All Nighter (film), a 2017 comedy
- The Allnighter (film), a 1987 comedy
- All Nighter (play), a 2025 comedy drama by Natalie Margolin
- The Allnighter (album), a 1984 album by Glenn Frey
- "The All-Nighter" (Dawson's Creek), a 1998 television episode
- All Nighter (bus service), a network in the San Francisco, California area
- Allniters, an Australian ska band
- WCW All Nighter, a series of professional wrestling specials
- "All Nighter", a song by Doja Cat from the album Amala (2018)

== See also ==
- Sleep deprivation and sleep deprivation in higher education
