= Fear of missing out =

Feeling of worry about lost opportunities

Smartphones enable people to remain in contact with their social and professional network continuously. This may result in compulsive checking for status updates and messages, for fear of missing an opportunity.

Fear of missing out (FOMO) is the feeling of apprehension that one is either not in the know about or missing out on information, events, experiences, or life decisions that could make one's life better. FOMO is also associated with a fear of regret, which may lead to concerns that one might miss an opportunity for social interaction, a novel experience, a memorable event, profitable investment, or the comfort of loved ones. It is characterized by a desire to stay continually connected with what others are doing, and can be described as the fear that deciding not to participate is the wrong choice. FOMO could result from not knowing about a conversation, missing a TV show, not attending a wedding or party, or hearing that others have discovered a new restaurant. In recent years, FOMO has been attributed to a number of negative psychological and behavioral symptoms.

FOMO has increased in recent times due to advancements in technology. Social networking sites create many opportunities for FOMO. While it provides opportunities for social engagement, it offers a view into an endless stream of activities in which a person is not involved. Further, a common tendency is to post about positive experiences (such as a great restaurant) rather than negative ones (such as a bad first date). Psychological dependence on social media can lead to FOMO or even pathological Internet use. FOMO is also present in video games, investing, and business marketing. The increasing popularity of the phrase has led to related linguistic and cultural variants. FOMO is associated with worsening depression and anxiety, and a lowered quality of life.

FOMO can also affect businesses. Hype and trends can lead business leaders to invest based on perceptions of what others are doing, rather than their own business strategy. This is also the idea of the bandwagon effect, where one individual may see another person or people do something and they begin to think it must be important because everyone is doing it. They might not even understand the meaning behind it, and they may not totally agree with it. Nevertheless, they are still going to participate because they do not want to be left out.

== History ==
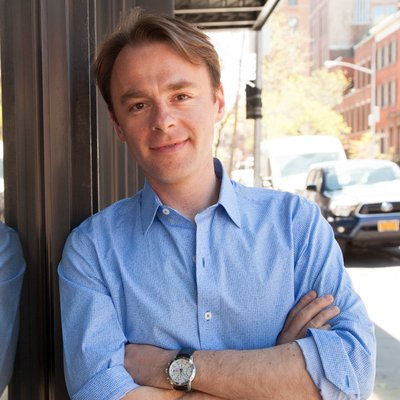
Patrick J. McGinnis coined the term FOMO while writing for The Harbus.

Patrick J. McGinnis coined the term FOMO and popularized it in a 2004 op-ed titled "Social Theory at HBS: McGinnis' Two FOs" in The Harbus, the magazine of Harvard Business School, where he was then a student. The article also referred to another related condition, Fear of a Better Option (FOBO), and the role of these two fears in the school's social life. Currently the term has been used as a hashtag on social media and has been mentioned in hundreds of news articles, from online sources like Salon.com to print papers like The New York Times.

=== Earlier forms ===
The phrase "fear of missing out" is a common English phrase, especially in the form "fear of missing out on (something)". The term "fear of missing out" (but not the term FOMO) was used earlier in the academic business literature by marketing strategist Dan Herman, who used it in presentations in the late 1990s, and included the phrase in a 2000 paper about "short-term brands", where a motivation for trying these brands is "ambition to exhaust all possibilities and the fear of missing out on something". Herman also believes the concept has evolved to become more widespread through mobile phone usage, texting, and social media and has helped flesh out the concept of the fear of missing out to the masses.

Before the Internet, a related phenomenon, "keeping up with the Joneses", was widely experienced. FOMO generalized and intensified this experience because so much more of people's lives became publicly documented and easily accessible.

== Symptoms ==
=== Psychological ===
Fear of missing out has been associated with a deficit in psychological needs. Self-determination theory contends that an individual's psychological satisfaction in their competence, autonomy, and relatedness consists of three basic psychological needs for human beings. Test subjects with lower levels of basic psychological satisfaction reported a higher level of FOMO. FOMO has also been linked to negative psychological effects in overall mood and general life satisfaction. A study performed on college campuses found that experiencing FOMO on a certain day led to a higher fatigue on that day specifically. Experiencing FOMO continuously throughout the semester also can lead to higher stress levels among students. An individual with an expectation to experience the fear of missing out can also develop a lower level of self-esteem. A study by JWTIntelligence suggests that FOMO can influence the formation of long-term goals and self-perceptions. In this study, around half of the respondents stated that they are overwhelmed by the amount of information needed to stay up-to-date, and that it is impossible to not miss out on something. The process of relative deprivation creates FOMO and dissatisfaction. It reduces psychological well-being. FOMO led to negative social and emotional experiences, such as boredom and loneliness. A 2013 study found that it negatively impacts mood and life satisfaction, reduces self-esteem, and affects mindfulness. Four in ten young people reported FOMO sometimes or often. FOMO was found to be negatively correlated with age, and men were more likely than women to report it. People who experience higher levels of FOMO tend to have a stronger desire for high social status, are more competitive with others of the same gender, and are more interested in short-term relationships. Studies have found that experiencing fear of missing out has been linked to anxiety or depression.

=== Behavioral ===
The fear of missing out stems from a feeling of missing social connections or information. This absent feeling is then followed by a need or drive to interact socially to boost connections. The fear of missing out not only leads to negative psychological effects but also has been shown to increase negative behavioral patterns. In aims of maintaining social connections, negative habits are formed or heightened. A 2019 University of Glasgow study surveyed 467 adolescents and found that the respondents felt societal pressure to always be available. According to John M. Grohol, founder and Editor-in-Chief of Psych Central, FOMO may lead to a constant search for new connections with others, abandoning current connections to do so. The fear of missing out derived from digital connection has been positively correlated with bad technology habits especially in youth. These negative habits included increased screen time, checking social media during school, or texting while driving. Social media use in the presence of others can be referred to as phubbing, the habit of snubbing a physically present person in favour of a mobile phone. Multiple studies have also identified a negative correlation between the hours of sleep and the scale at which individuals experience fear of missing out. A lack of sleep in college students experiencing FOMO can be attributed to the number of social interactions that occur late at night on campuses.

== Settings ==
=== Social media ===
Fear of missing out has a positive correlation with higher levels of social media usage. Social media connects individuals and showcases the lives of others at their peak. This gives people the fear of missing out when they feel like others on social media are taking part in positive life experiences that they personally are not also experiencing. This fear of missing out related to social media has symptoms including anxiety, loneliness, and a feeling of inadequacy compared to others. Self-esteem plays a key role in the levels a person feels when experiencing the fear of missing out, as their self worth is influenced by people they observe on social media. There are two types of anxiety; one related to genetics that is permanent, and one that is temporary. The temporary state of anxiety is the one that is more relevant to the fear of missing out, and is directly related to the individual looking at social media sites for a short period of time. This anxiety is caused by a loss of feeling of belonging through the concept of social exclusion. FOMO-sufferers may increasingly seek access to others' social lives, and consume an escalating amount of real-time information. A survey in 2012 indicated that 83% of respondents said that there is information overload in regards that there is too much to watch and read. Constant information that is available to people through social media causes the fear of missing out as people feel worse about themselves for not staying up to date with relevant information. Social media shows just exactly what people are missing out on in real time including events like parties, opportunities, and other events leading people to fear missing out on other related future events. Another survey indicates that almost 40% of people from ages 12 through 67 indicate that social media has led to a higher feeling of the fear of missing out. Millennials are the most affected by the fear of missing out, with the highest proportion compared to other generations and this is due to the prominence of social media for the generation. Social media platforms that are associated with FOMO include Snapchat, Facebook, and Instagram.

=== Video games ===
People want to be a part of the in-group and feel like they belong, making them fear missing out on being part of the in-group. People do not want to feel like they are missing out of being part of the belonging group with respect to video games, which causes a video game addiction. When people align their social identities with the video game they are playing, they fear that not playing enough will outcast them from the group they are playing with, leading to the fear of missing out on being a dedicated member of the community.

Within video games, FOMO is also used to describe the similar anxiety around missing the ability to obtain in-game items or complete activities that are only available for a limited time, such as those in battle passes. This is particularly common for multiplayer video games, where such items are cosmetic in nature but reflect a player's skill to other players in the game and can become a sign of social standing within the game's community; wherein failure to acquire a limited cosmetic item may lead to social outcasting.

=== Investing ===
Fear of missing out has an influential role in the investment market for cryptocurrencies. With the prominence of investors making large sums of money through cryptocurrencies, people may develop FOMO in anticipation of the next perceived get-rich-quick currency. This phenomenon has caused the rise of "pump and dump" schemes, where investors exploit FOMO to raise the price of cryptocurrencies and sell them for a profit, while lower-tier traders are not able to see profits. This has also led to the use of bots in cryptocurrency trades, as the high volatility of the cryptocurrency market can cause profits to vary rapidly even within the span of twenty seconds. Pump and dumps are a legal grey area for cryptocurrencies so it is not illegal for influencers to use fear of missing out to manipulate individuals.

The fear of missing out is also prominent in the regular stock market. Investors do not want to miss out on potential stock gains when the market is on an upward trend. There is a fear of missing out on making big gains through stocks driving the market since the market was at a low point before. The fear of missing out with regards to investing is not applied evenly to different types of stocks and even within different brands of stocks in the same sector. For example, there are differences between the fear of missing out on Burberry and Prada stock in which the Prada stock is seen as more valuable and people more likely fear to miss out on buying that particular stock.

=== Marketing ===
Advertising and marketing campaigns may also seek to intensify FOMO within various marketing strategies. Examples include AT&T's "Don't be left behind" campaign, Duracell's Powermat "Stay in charge" campaign and Heineken's "Sunrise" campaign. AT&T's "Don't be left behind" campaign used the fear of missing out to make people want to join their network and receive messages and emails at fast 4G rates, to not miss updates from friends. Duracell's Powermat "Stay in charge" campaign showcased four dead phones and advertised to the viewers that the owners of the phones were missing out on updates on the phones because they were not using Duracell's charging technology to power the phones. Heineken's "Sunrise" campaign aimed to encourage responsible drinking by portraying excessive drinking as a way to miss the best parts of a party, rather than claiming that excessive drinking is a risk to personal health. Other brands attempt to counter FOMO, such as Nescafé's "Wake up to life" campaign. Harnessing TV viewers' FOMO is also perceived to foster higher broadcast ratings. Real-time updates about status and major social events allow for a more engaging media consumption experience and faster dissemination of information. Real-time tweets about the Super Bowl are considered to be correlated with higher TV ratings due to their appeal to FOMO and the prevalence of social media usage.

== Variants ==
=== Cultural ===
FOMO, as a word and as a social phenomenon, has several cultural variants. Before Americans defined FOMO, however, Singaporeans had already named their own version, "kiasu". Taken from Hokkien, kiasu translates to a fear of losing out but also encompasses any sort of competitive, stingy or selfish behavior.

In Duanju format fiction, the use of techniques such as cliffhangers can heighten the feeling of FOMO by maintaining strong anticipation between episodes.

=== Linguistic ===
The term FOMO has also inspired offshoots such as FOBO, FOMOMO, MOMO, FOJI, BROMO, NEMO, SLOMO and JOMO.

- FOBO – originally Fear Of a Better Option (singular), now often Fear Of Better Options (plural) – was coined by Patrick J. McGinnis in the same 2004 article that introduced FOMO. McGinnis describes FOBO as a byproduct of a hyper-busy, hyper-connected world in which everything seems possible, and, as a result, you are spoiled for choice.
- ROMO is a term coined during the COVID-19 pandemic that stands for Reality of Missing Out. ROMO describes the feeling of knowing that you are missing out on things.
- FOMOMO stands for the Fear Of the Mystery Of Missing Out. FOMOMO refers to a more extreme case of FOMO that occurs when one's mobile device is unusable, resulting in angst caused by the inability to see what one is missing out on social media. Deprived of seeing friends' social media posts, one may automatically assume that those on your social media feed are having a better time than you.
- MOMO stands for the Mystery Of Missing Out, referring to the paranoia that arises when one's friends do not post anything on social media resulting in attempts to piece together what one may be missing out on.
- FOJI stands for Fear Of Joining In and refers to the fear of posting on social media in the worry that nobody will want to connect, follow or be friends with you. FOJI is often seen as the opposite of MOMO.
- BROMO refers to instances when one's friends ("bros") protect them from missing out. An example of BROMO would be if one's friends refrained from posting pictures from their night out for fear of making anyone feel left out.
- NEMO stands for Nearly but not fully Missing Out. NEMO can refer to people who are on online networks, but do not check them frequently.
- SLOMO stands for Slow to Missing Out, and refers to the gradual feeling that one is missing out.
- JOMO stands for the Joy of Missing Out and refers to the feeling of pleasure when missing out. Coined in 2004 by Anil Dash (a blogger and CEO of software company Glitch), JOMO is a positive belief that cutting off all social media and digital devices can be blissful. JOMO is about enjoying the present without feeling anxious about missing out on something. It is not about self-isolating, rather establishing time to disconnect and recharge.
- FOBIA stands for the Fear of Being Ignored Altogether and refers to the necessity of maintaining an online presence to feel validated as a human being.
- FOBI stands for the "fear of being involved" and refers to one avoiding being involved in something.
- FOPI stand for "Fear Of Price Increase" and refers to one buying a new video game console before a price hike, this meaning is coined by Nintendo Life in 2026 after recent price increases of the PlayStation 5 and Nintendo Switch 2.

== See also ==
- Appeal to novelty
- Bed rotting
- Hyperbolic discounting – Economics concept
- Hunger marketing – Marketing strategy targeting human emotions
- Keeping up with the Joneses – Idiom on comparing oneself to neighbors
- Loss aversion – Aspect of decision and prospect theories
- Midlife crisis – Transition of identity and self-confidence
- Missed connection – Personal ad
- Murray's system of needs – Part of Henry Murray's theory of personality
- Nomophobia – Fear of not having a mobile phone
- Opportunity cost – Benefit lost by a choice between options
- Peer pressure – Influencing peers to conform
- Relative deprivation – Measure of poverty and social exclusion
- Self-determination theory – Macro theory of human motivation and personality
- Shiny object syndrome
- Social influence bias – Herd behaviours in online social media
- Social media – Virtual online communities
- Status Anxiety – 2004 book by Alain de Botton
- Social proof – Psychological phenomenon regarding conformity
- Spaving
