= Patrick McGinnis (disambiguation) =

Patrick McGinnis (1927–1990) was a Pennsylvania politician.

Patrick McGinnis may refer to:

- W. Patrick McGinnis (born c.1947), former CEO of Nestlé Purina PetCare Company
- Patrick James McGinnis, American venture capitalist and author
