= WCW Thunder debut episode =

Professional wrestling television special

WCW Thunder
- The Debut WCW Thunder logo
- Promotion: World Championship Wrestling
- Brand: Thunder
- Date: January 8, 1998
- City: Daytona Beach, Florida
- Venue: Ocean Center

The WCW Thunder debut episode was a professional wrestling show that marked the debut of World Championship Wrestling's (WCW) weekly WCW Thunder television show. The show took place on January 8, 1998.

The show aired live on TBS, taking place at the Ocean Center in Daytona Beach, Florida.

== Storylines ==
The event included 13 matches that resulted from scripted storylines and the results were predetermined by WCW's writers.

== Event ==
The event aired live with David Penzer announcing in the ring and Bobby Heenan, Tony Schiavone, and Lee Marshall commentating during the event.

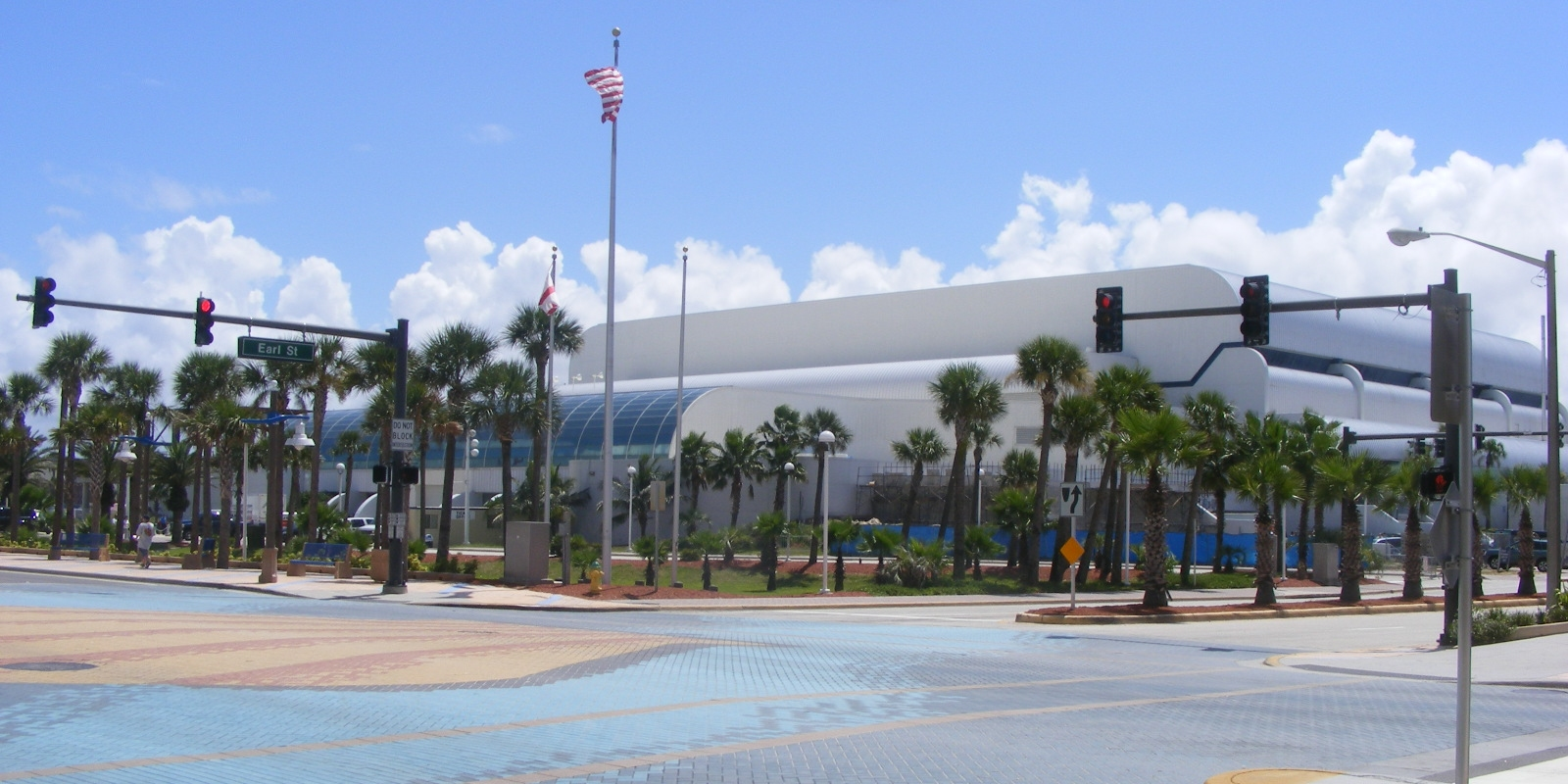
Ocean Center

== Results ==
No.	Results	Stipulations	Times
1	Randy Savage (w/ Miss Elizabeth) defeated Chris Adams by disqualification	Singles match	2:31
2	Rick Martel defeated Louie Spicolli	Singles match	3:17
3	Tenzan defeated Ohara (w/ Sonny Onoo)	Singles match	2:57
4	Ric Flair defeated Chris Jericho	Singles match	4:44
5	The Giant defeated Meng (w/ Jimmy Hart)	Singles match	2:03
6	Bill Goldberg defeated Steve McMichael	Singles match	2:22
7	Steiner Brothers (Rick Steiner and Scott Steiner) (w/ Ted DiBiase) defeated Buff Bagwell and Konnan (w/ Vincent)	Tag-team match	3:39
8	Larry Zbyszko (representing WCW) defeated Eric Bischoff (representing the nWo) (w/ Scott Hall) by disqualification	Singles match for Control of WCW Monday Nitro (w/ Bret Hart as guest referee)	11:30
9	Ray Traylor defeated Scott Hall	Singles match	4:19
10	Juventud Guerrera defeated Ultimo Dragon (c)	Singles match for the WCW World Cruiserweight Championship	4:22
11	Lex Luger defeated Scott Norton	Singles match	2:14
12	Diamond Dallas Page (c) defeated Kevin Nash (w/ Hollywood Hogan) by disqualification	Singles match for the WCW United States Heavyweight Championship	6:41
13	Sting defeated Hollywood Hogan	Dark match	17:34
(c) / – the champion(s) heading into the match
