= World Championship Wrestling =

American professional wrestling company

World Championship Wrestling, Inc.
- Logo used between 1988 and 1999.
- Trade name: World Championship Wrestling
- Formerly: Universal Wrestling Corporation (1988, 2001–2017); World Championship Wrestling, Inc. (1988–2001)
- Type: Private
- Industry: Professional wrestling
- Predecessor: Georgia Championship Wrestling; Jim Crockett Promotions
- Founded: October 11, 1988; 38 years ago
- Founder: Ted Turner
- Defunct: March 31, 2001; 25 years ago (de facto); December 16, 2017; 8 years ago (de jure)
- Fate: 2001: Select assets purchased by the WWF; 2017: Shut down and renamed by AOL Time Warner, with holding company later being absorbed into parent Turner Broadcasting System
- Successor: WWE brands
- Headquarters: Williams Street; Atlanta, Georgia, U.S.
- Area served: Worldwide
- Products: Home video; Live events; Merchandise; Music; Pay-per-view; Publishing; TV
- Services: Licensing
- Revenue: ~$500 million (1999)
- Number of employees: c. 150 (March 1998)
- Parent: Turner Broadcasting System (1988–1996); Time Warner (1996–2001); Time Warner (2001–2017, as Universal Wrestling Corporation); WWE (2001–present, as WCW, Inc.)
- Website: WCW Wrestling (archived); WCW on WWE.com

World Championship Wrestling (WCW) was an American professional wrestling promotion founded by Ted Turner in 1988, after Turner Broadcasting System, through a subsidiary named Universal Wrestling Corporation, purchased the assets of National Wrestling Alliance (NWA) territory Jim Crockett Promotions (JCP) (which had aired its programming on TBS).

For all of its existence, WCW was one of the two top professional wrestling promotions in the United States alongside the World Wrestling Federation (WWF, now WWE), at one point surpassing the latter in terms of popularity. After initial success through utilization of established wrestling stars of the 1980s, the company appointed Eric Bischoff to executive producer of television in 1993. Under Bischoff's leadership, the company enjoyed a period of mainstream success characterized by a shift to reality-based storylines, and notable hirings of former WWF talent. WCW also gained attention for developing a popular cruiserweight division, which showcased an acrobatic, fast-paced, lucha libre-inspired style of wrestling. In 1995, WCW debuted their live flagship television program Monday Nitro, and subsequently developed a ratings competition against the flagship program of the WWF, Monday Night Raw, in a period now known as the Monday Night War. From mid-1996 to early 1998, WCW surpassed their rival program in the ratings for 83 consecutive weeks.

Beginning from late 1998, WCW endured significant losses in ratings and revenue due to creative missteps and popularity takeover by the WWF, and suffered from the fallout of the 2001 merger of America Online (AOL) and Turner Broadcasting parent Time Warner (now Skydance). Soon thereafter, WCW was shut down, and the WWF purchased select WCW assets in 2001, including its video library, intellectual property (including the WCW name and championships), and some wrestler contracts. The corporate subsidiary, which was retained to deal with legal obligations and reverted to the Universal Wrestling Corporation name, officially became defunct in 2017.

== History ==
=== 1982 to 1993: Origins, creation, and NWA membership ===
Alternate black-and-white logo used from 1988 to 1999

World Championship Wrestling was a television show produced by Georgia Championship Wrestling (GCW) since 1982. Jim Barnett (who had briefly owned the Australian promotion of that name) came to Atlanta in the 1970s during an internal struggle for control of GCW. Barnett ultimately became majority owner of the promotion, and began using his previous promotion's name for GCW's weekly Saturday television program in 1982. Following the events that became known as Black Saturday, in which GCW and its television program briefly came under the ownership of the WWF, the promotion was eventually purchased by Charlotte, North Carolina–based Jim Crockett Promotions (JCP), the promoter of the Mid-Atlantic territory immediately north of Georgia.

Influential wrestling magazine Pro Wrestling Illustrated and its sister publications thereafter habitually referred to JCP as "World Championship Wrestling", "WCW" and most commonly "the World Championship area" and continued to do so until early 1988 when it began referring to the company solely as the NWA, reasoning that "it has become apparent that the NWA and the World Championship area are one and the same."

By late 1988, JCP was financially struggling after further territory acquisitions. Ted Turner, the namesake principal owner of Turner Broadcasting System, formed a new subsidiary in October 1988 to acquire most of the assets of JCP. The acquisition was completed on November 2, 1988. While initially the subsidiary was incorporated as the "Universal Wrestling Corporation", following the purchase the decision was made to utilize the familiar "World Championship Wrestling" as the name for the promotion.

In July 1991, six months after the creation of the latter, the NWA World Heavyweight Championship and the WCW World Heavyweight Championship permanently ceased to be a double crown when the NWA held out for two months on endorsing the stripping of Ric Flair as champion until his arrival in the WWF that September. The NWA further declined to endorse as champion Flair's WCW's successor Lex Luger. Instead the two organisations recognised separate World championship lineages while maintaining an otherwise cordial relationship. In late Summer/early Autumn 1993, a behind-the-scenes dispute between WCW and the NWA Board of Directors over who had the right to authorize NWA World Heavyweight Championship title changes ultimately resulted in WCW formally withdrawing from the NWA and becoming a standalone wrestling promotion.

=== 1993 to 1996: Eric Bischoff takes charge; launch of WCW Monday Nitro ===
In February 1993, former commentator Eric Bischoff was appointed as Executive Producer of WCW, and by 1994 he had been promoted once again to Senior Vice President, a position which gave Bischoff both creative and financial control of WCW. At this point, the promotion was struggling financially (Note: In Controversy Creates Cash (2006), Bischoff claims that WCW lost approximately $10,000,000 in 1993) and was widely perceived within the wrestling industry to be at a low ebb. To counter this, Bischoff felt that WCW was in need of radical reform; to this end, Bischoff sought to modernise WCW and move its image away from that of a Southern-based "rasslin" company. To achieve this, Bischoff increased WCW's production values, avoided unprofitable house shows, increased the number of WCW pay-per-views (PPVs, which were profitable), decreased the number of Southern accents on commentary, and began recruiting top stars away from the World Wrestling Federation (WWF). This led to marquee names such as Hulk Hogan and "The Macho Man" Randy Savage joining WCW's ranks and helping to supplement its business.

In 1995, during a face-to-face meeting with Ted Turner, Bischoff was able to convince Turner that in order for WCW to become competitive with the WWF, WCW would require an equivalent to WWF's new flagship cable show WWF Raw, which aired on the USA Network. The meeting led to Turner greenlighting the creation of WCW Monday Nitro, which would air on TNT on the same day and in the same time slot as Raw. Nitro would debut on September 4, 1995, and directly lead into the Monday Night War era of professional wrestling, in which WCW Nitro and WWF Raw would fiercely compete to beat each other in the Nielson ratings each and every week. The struggle between the two promotions, each one attempting to produce the best television show possible each week, led to an explosion in the popularity of professional wrestling in the United States and in hindsight is widely considered a golden era.

=== 1996 to 1998: WCW's exponential growth; Nitro defeats Raw for 83 weeks ===

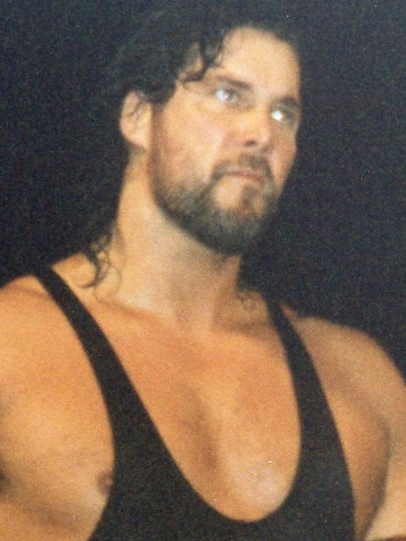
Kevin Nash

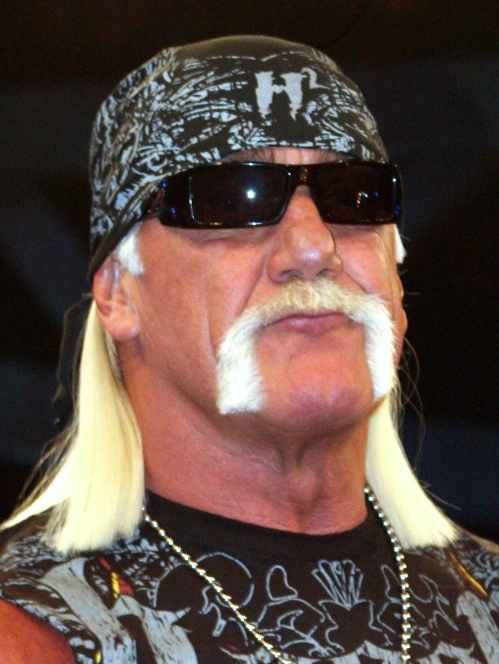
"Hollywood" Hulk Hogan

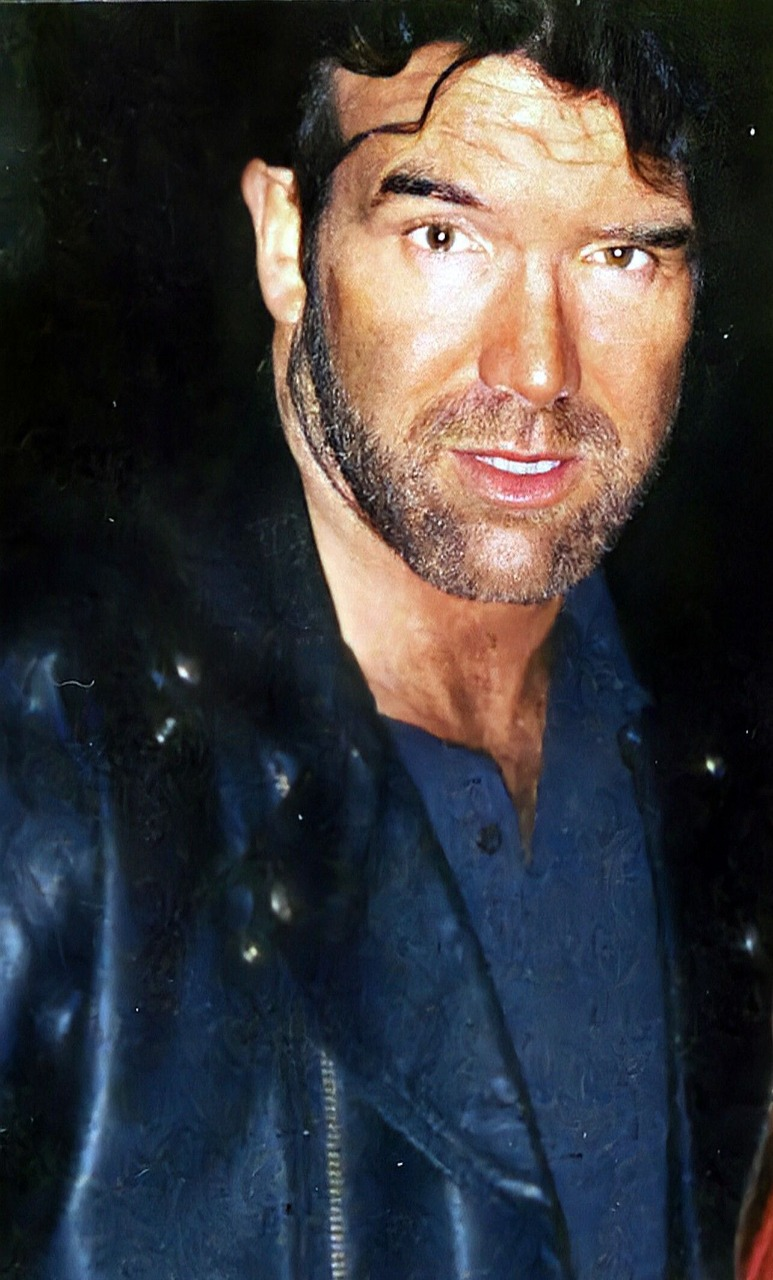
Scott Hall

The creation of the New World Order stable was a pivotal movement in WCW History and coincided with WCW Nitro overtaking WWF Raw in the Nielsen ratings

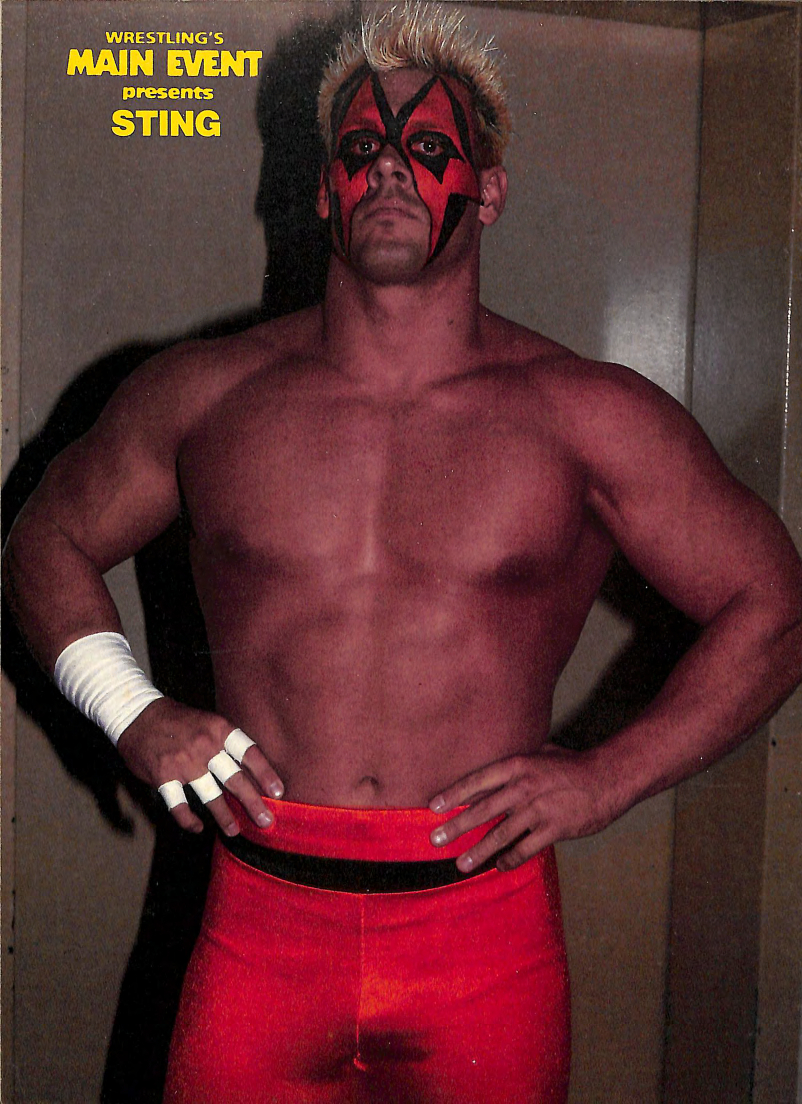
- "Surfer" Sting
- pre-1996

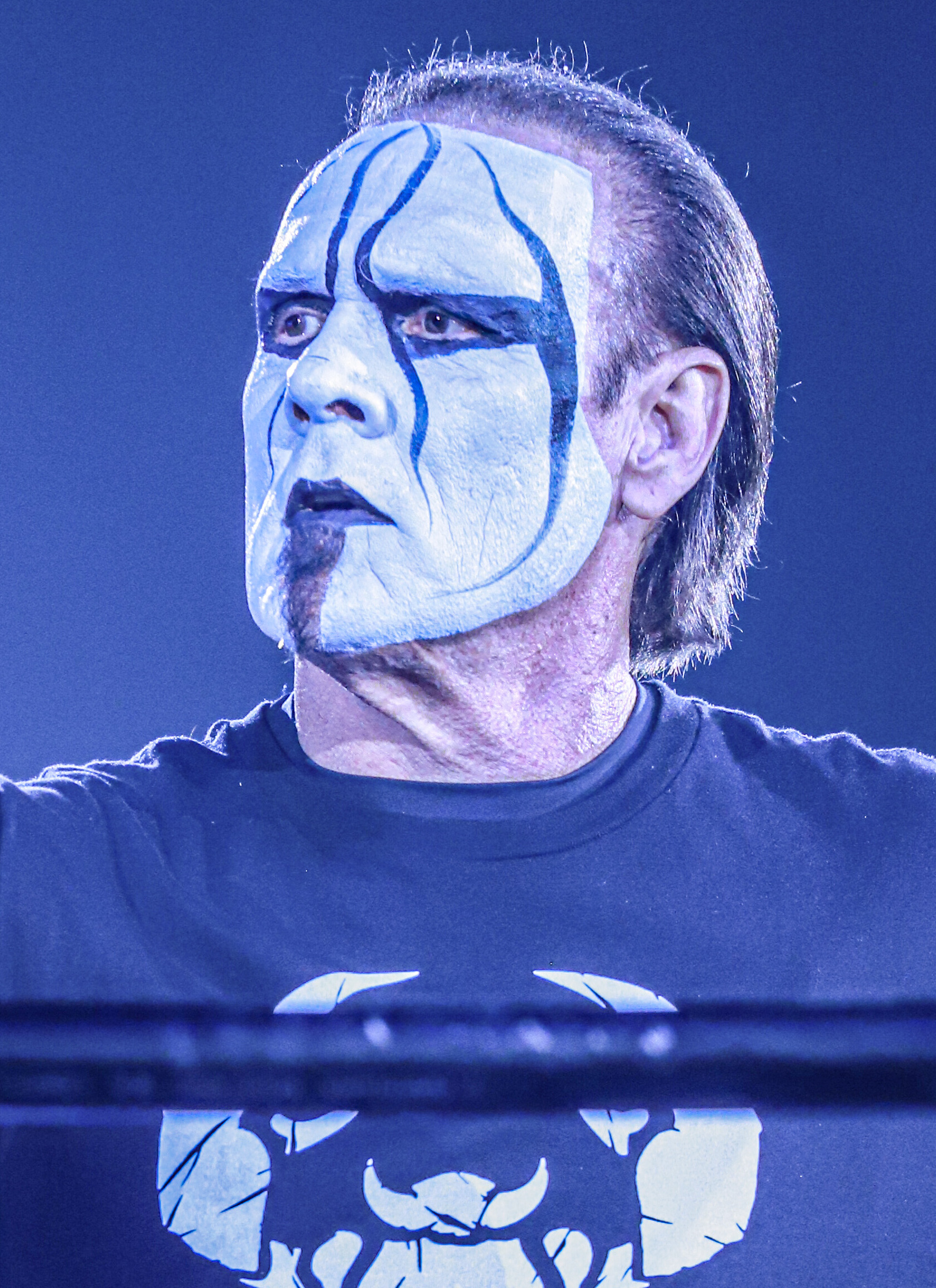
- "Crow" Sting
- 1996 onwards

As part of the tonal shifts that occurred in WCW under Eric Bischoff, performers such as Sting dramatically altered their personas

WCW Monday Nitro proved a success for the company, which was immediately able to create a television audience of an equivalent size to WWF Raw. Between September 1995 and May 1996, Nitro and Raw regularly traded victories in the battle for the largest television audience. However, in June 1996, Nitro would begin a streak of 83 consecutive victories over Raw, initially sparked by the start of the New World Order (nWo) storyline. The start of the nWo angle saw former WWF talent Scott Hall and Kevin Nash unexpectedly leave the WWF to come to Monday Nitro on consecutive episodes, and each time insinuate that they were there on behalf of the WWF to fight a proxy war. They also alleged that they would soon be joined by a third major figure; this "third man" was eventually revealed to be Hulk Hogan at Bash at the Beach 1996. A major advantage WCW Nitro initially had over WWF Raw was that Nitro was live-to-air every week, while Raw alternated between live episodes and ones taped in advance and aired the following week. Nitro's live atmosphere enhanced segments such as the Hall and Nash debuts as it gave the show an unscripted, "anything can happen at any time" feeling to the television audience.

The start of the nWo angle, which immediately proved immensely popular and intriguing to wrestling fans, was part of a wider shift in the WCW presentation still being pursued by Eric Bischoff. As part of his overhaul of WCW, Bischoff wanted to grow WCW's audience amongst 18 to 35-year-olds. To that end, he alongside WCW's booker Kevin Sullivan began grounding WCW characters and storylines more in reality, utilising real names and darker themes in contrast to the more cartoon-like presentation which had dominated wrestling in the 1980s and early 1990s. An example of this shift in tone was seen in the transformation of top WCW star Sting over the course of 1996 following the start of the nWo angle, whose persona shifted from a colorful and cheerful clean-cut face to a dark, depressed and brooding antihero inspired by the 1994 film The Crow. (Note: Although Sting's shift to the "Crow" inspired character was part of the overall direction by Eric Bischoff, the specific idea that Sting should adopt the dark avenging character was generated by Scott Hall after seeing the film.) Another major innovation occurring concurrently in WCW was the introduction of the Cruiserweight division, which saw the introduction of smaller, more agile and more athletic wrestlers performing fast-paced, high-flying dangerous matches on WCW shows. This added another unique element to WCW shows that helped propel their surging popularity.

The combination of a more adult-orientated presentation, live and unedited television, more reality-based storylines, new top-level talent, new and intriguing characters, and more varied in-ring action saw WCW's fortunes dramatically shift; the company went from struggling financially as late as 1995 to generating $55 million in profit in 1998. December 1997's Starrcade pay-per-view (PPV) event became the highest-grossing PPV of all time for the company, thanks in large part to the show being billed as the culmination of a year-and-a-half feud between Sting and "Hollywood" Hulk Hogan.

=== 1998 to 2001: Leadership changes; collapse and eventual demise ===
1996 and 1997 had been banner years for WCW, with profits and popularity soaring. 1998 saw profits continue to rise. However, maintaining the quality of the shows became difficult, particularly after WCW's owners Time Warner Entertainment (who bought Turner Broadcasting System in 1996) ordered the creation of a second live cable WCW program WCW Thunder, to air on Thursdays on TBS starting on January 8, 1998, as well as ordering a third hour to be added to Nitro's runtime. Nonetheless, the creation of new major headline babyface stars such as Diamond Dallas Page and Goldberg were causes for optimism, making the company initially less dependent on the nWo storyline for ratings. However, beginning in Spring 1998, WCW began an angle which saw the nWo split into a heel faction, nWo Hollywood (centered around "Hollywood" Hulk Hogan), and the rival face nWo Wolfpac (consisting of stars such as Kevin Nash, Randy Savage, Sting, Lex Luger and Konnan). Speaking in hindsight in 2023, Eric Bischoff has said the angle was rushed, ill-conceived and had no long-term direction. By this point, many critics began to argue that WCW was now completely overreliant on the nWo storyline and unable to pivot to a new grand concept. Additionally, beginning in the summer of 1998, Bischoff has claimed that Time Warner Entertainment management began to increasingly micromanage WCW and meddle in its presentation. Executives at Time Warner Entertainment began to increasingly advocate that WCW should pivot to more a "family-friendly" orientation, and drop the reforms that turned around the company's fortunes.

Concurrently to WCW beginning to struggle under the weight of its own momentum, the WWF began to turn the corner on its own reforms. Having been caught flatfooted by the total reconfiguration of WCW and the success of Nitro in 1996 and 1997, by 1998 the WWF was building its own momentum. Taking most of the innovations WCW had implemented and reapplying them to their own presentation, WWF began its "Attitude Era". Building around newly emerging stars such as Stone Cold Steve Austin and The Rock, as well as WWF promoter Vince McMahon becoming a major on-screen character himself, the WWF finally ended Nitro's 83 weeks of ratings victories on April 13, 1998. For the next four months, Nitro and Raw would trade wins until October 26, 1998, when Nitro scored its last-ever ratings victory over Raw. The combined pressure of the WWF seizing back the ratings lead as well as WCW's own internal problem caused tension amongst both the on-screen talent and management.

By November 1998 Kevin Nash had become head booker of WCW, overseeing the creative direction of both Nitro and Thunder. Nash's tenure was fraught with unpopular decisions, such as the move that saw the popular undefeated streak of WCW Champion Goldberg ended by Nash himself, who then became champion, only for Nash to then lie down for Hollywood Hogan and reform a reunited nWo in the widely panned "Fingerpoke of Doom" angle.

==== Bischoff removed from power; Vince Russo and Ed Ferrara arrive ====
By September 1999, the rapidly declining ratings of Nitro (now half that of Raw), drastic dropoff in revenue, (Note: Having made $55,000,000 in profits in 1998, by the final quarter of 1999 it was apparent to both Bischoff and Time Warner management that WCW would lose at least $5,000,000 that year.) and the increasing antagonism between Eric Bischoff and Time Warner executives prompted the head of Turner Sports, Harvey Schiller, to relieve Bischoff of his position. Almost immediately Schiller found a duo to replace Bischoff: former head writers for Raw Vince Russo and Ed Ferrara. Russo had just weeks prior walked off the job at the WWF after a dispute with Vince McMahon over work hours, and Ed Ferrara soon followed. Russo and Ferrara were heralded at the time as the main drivers in the turnaround at WWF over the previous two years with their writing philosophy of "Crash TV", a presentation style that emphasized Soap opera style storylines, lengthier non-wrestling segments, frequent heel/face turns, an increased amount of female representation on the show, expanded storyline depth, frequent title changes, and a greater focus on developing mid-card talent.

The tenure of Russo and Ferrara at the creative helm of WCW was short-lived as Vince Russo went home following the January 10, 2000 Nitro after Brad Siegal informed him that they wanted to move to a booking committee. Russo, due to the terms in his contract, refused and went home with pay. Ferrara stayed on as a writer with the new booking committee headed by Kevin Sullivan. AOL and Time Warner had merged in January 2000 and, according to Bischoff and Russo, headquarters′ eagerness to tone down WCW had only grown more intense because of this.

Mounting frustrations amongst the talent resulted in many leaving WCW for the WWF; The Giant and Chris Jericho were the first major talent to "jump" to the WWF in 1999, but they were soon followed by many others. Chris Benoit (WCW World Heavyweight Champion at the time), Dean Malenko, Eddie Guerrero and Perry Saturn, who performed together on WCW television as "The Revolution", all collectively walked out of WCW and over to the WWF in January 2000 due to Vince Russo losing power back to Kevin Sullivan and a booking committee, an incident which resulted in a number of firings amongst WCW management. With shakeups to WCW management becoming more and more frequent, the WCW talent began to lose any sense of leadership or direction, which in turn caused them to form bickering political cliques amongst themselves.

==== Bischoff and Russo collaboration ====
In April 2000, WCW attempted to resolve its creative issues by asking Eric Bischoff to return but work alongside the returning Vince Russo as a duo. The pairing was not cohesive and frequently chafed over the direction of the company. Creatively, the year 2000 saw WCW attempt numerous publicity stunts to gain traction, such as making actor David Arquette (who then had no professional wrestling experience) the WCW World Heavyweight Champion. These moves only served to push traditional wrestling fans away from WCW. Events such as Goldberg forcing WCW World Heavyweight Champion Bret Hart into retirement following a botched move at Starrcade 1999, followed just days later by Goldberg very seriously injuring himself during an angle on Thunder, (Note: On the December 23, 1999, live episode of Thunder, WCW shot an angle in which Goldberg chased after members of the nWo backstage, who attempted to escape in a limousine. Goldberg proceeded to punch through the glass window of the limousine as an improvised part of the segment. The glass was real and as it shattered it cut Goldberg's arm deeply, severing an artery. After the segment, Goldberg was rushed to a local hospital and at one point his arm might have to be amputated. Eventually, the wound was closed with 40 stitches but it took 5 months for Goldberg to recover from the injury.) and Hollywood Hogan seemingly quitting the company live on PPV at Bash at the Beach 2000 only seemed to further a sense that the company was spiralling out of control. By July 2000 Bischoff had walked off the job.

=== 2001: Sale to the World Wrestling Federation ===
Final logo for WCW before ceasing operations used from 1999 to 2001

In 2000, several potential buyers for WCW were rumored to show interest in the company. Ted Turner, however, did not hold influence over Time Warner before the final merger of America Online (AOL) and Time Warner in 2001, and most offers were rejected. Eric Bischoff, working with Fusient Media Ventures, made a bid to acquire the company in January 2001. One of the primary backers in the WCW deal backed out after AOL Time Warner refused to allow WCW to continue airing on its networks, leaving Fusient to take that offer off the table while it attempted to bring a new deal around.

In the meantime, Jamie Kellner was handed control over the Turner Broadcasting division in 2000, eventually succeeding Ted Turner on March 7, 2001. Along with AOL Time Warner, Kellner deemed WCW, along with Turner Sports as a whole, to be out of line with its image and saying that it "would not be favorable enough to get the 'right' advertisers to buy airtime" (even though Thunder was the highest-rated show on TBS at the time). As a result, WCW programming was cancelled on TBS and TNT. Another factor in Kellner's decision to cancel all WCW programming was the terms of the company's purchase deal with Fusient, which included giving Fusient control over time slots on TNT and TBS even if those slots did not air WCW programming. WCW's losses were then written off via purchase accounting.

The cancellation of WCW programming left the WWF free to acquire the key assets of WCW through its new subsidiary W. Acquisition Company, which was renamed WCW Inc. afterwards. AOL Time Warner sold the rights to the World Championship Wrestling name, branding, championships, video library, some wrestler contracts, and all other remaining assets to WWF for $2.5 million in March 2001. Shortly afterwards WWF paid an additional $1.8 million to cover costs to AOL Time Warner in the negotiations, bringing the final tally of WCW's sale to $4.3 million. AOL Time Warner maintained its subsidiary, which reverted to its original legal name of the Universal Wrestling Corporation (UWC), to deal with legal obligations and liabilities not acquired by the WWF. The UWC was listed as a subsidiary of Time Warner until 2017, when it was merged into Turner Broadcasting System.

Some of the WCW roster joined the WWF immediately and participated in The Invasion storyline as part of The Alliance which lasted until the end of 2001. However, many of WCW's top stars still had guaranteed contracts with UWC, and WWF chose not to buy out these contracts; most of these wrestlers chose to sit out the length of their contracts rather than breaking them in order to work for the WWF. Most would eventually find their way to WWE, although Sting remained a notable exception for almost a decade and a half. After the Invasion storyline concluded, the WWF divided their roster into two brands. Reports indicate that the WWF considered using the WCW name for one of the brands, but instead introduced Raw and SmackDown!, named after WWF's two top programs. The decision was reportedly influenced by the poor reception of a July 2001 WCW-themed match broadcast on Raw Is War where Booker T defended his WCW Championship against challenger Buff Bagwell.

Many other WCW wrestlers moved to the World Wrestling All-Stars (WWA), XWF, Total Nonstop Action Wrestling (TNA) and Ring of Honor, which were all formed after the end of WCW.

== Features ==
=== Cruiserweight division ===
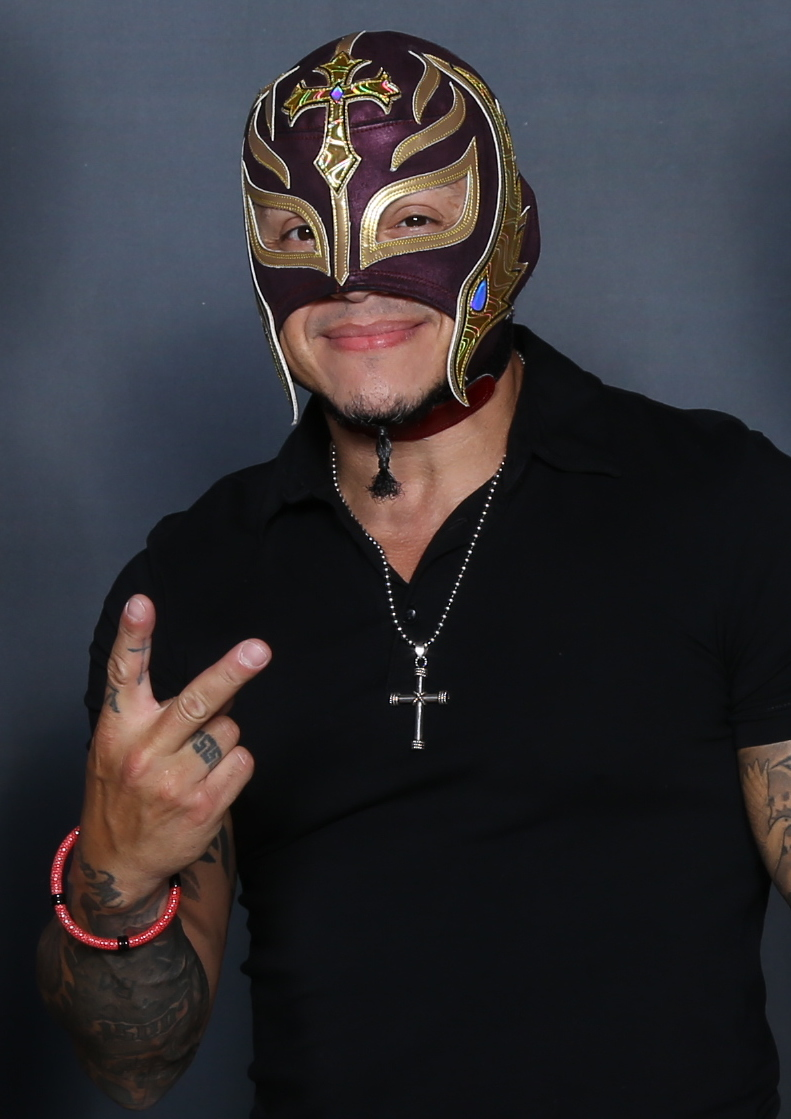
5 time WCW Cruiserweight Champion Rey Mysterio

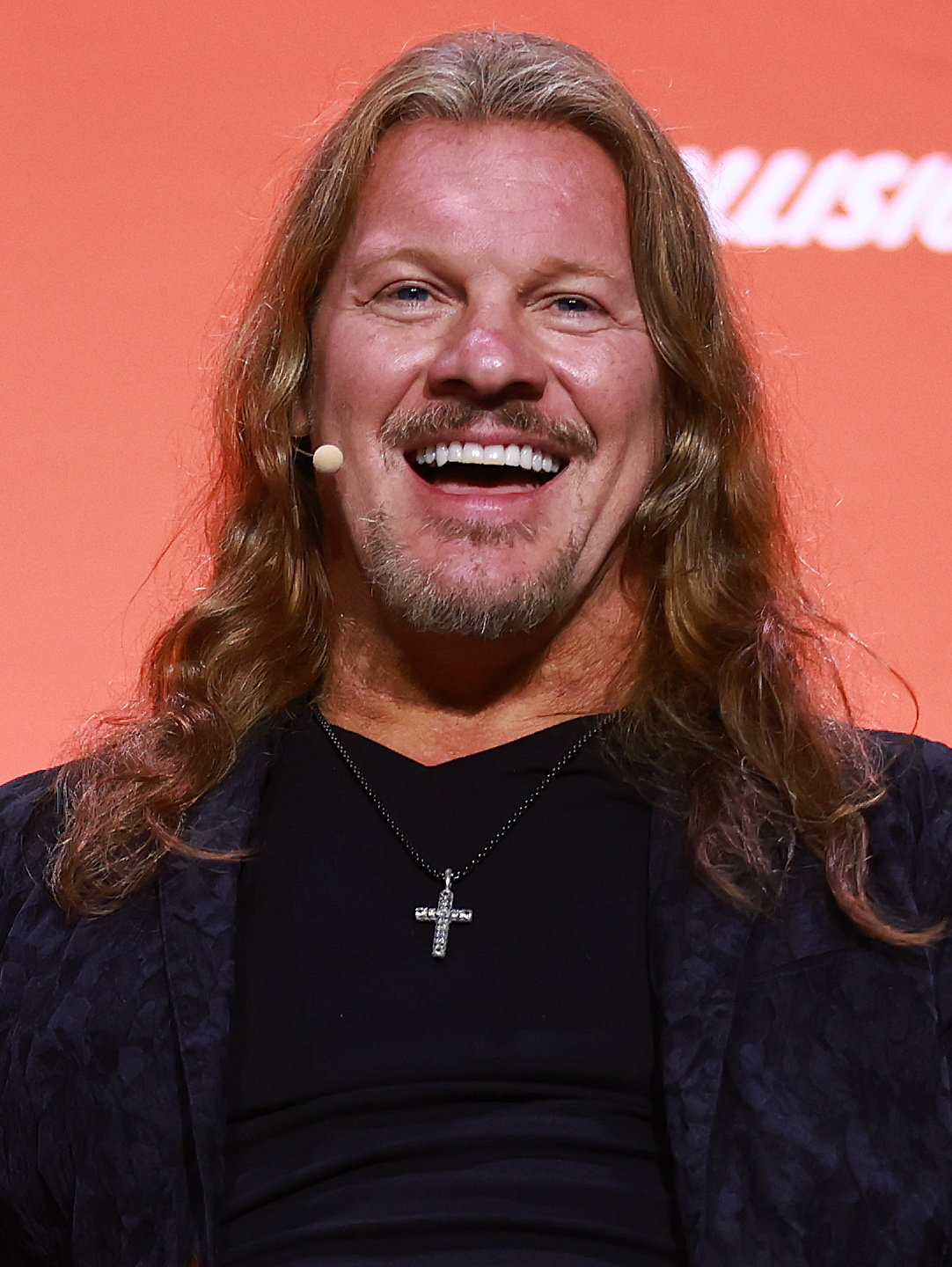
4 time WCW Cruiserweight Champion Chris Jericho

The WCW Cruiserweight division is widely credited with highlighting and benefiting a generation of smaller-sized, high-flying agile wrestlers in an era when "big men" were the norm. It produced long-lasting stars such as Rey Mysterio and Chris Jericho

In the spring of 1996, WCW introduced its "Cruiserweight division", a segmented portion of the roster featuring smaller, faster and more agile wrestlers that contrasted starkly, both visually and stylistically, with their heavyweight counterparts. Although weight categories were not a new concept in wrestling or even WCW, the WCW Cruiserweight Division was quickly able to form a unique and popular identity by integrating and mixing wrestlers from all around the world and from vastly different wrestling styles, particularly Mexican luchadores such as Rey Misterio Jr., Psicosis, and Juventud Guerrera, but also Japanese "Super Juniors" such as Último Dragón. North American wrestlers, such as Chris Jericho, Eddie Guerrero, Dean Malenko and Chris Benoit, who had travelled abroad to Mexico and Japan earlier in their careers and learned the local styles were also able to thrive in the division. The division as a whole became a showcase of a fast-paced, aerial and athletic style of wrestling which became highly influential in both the short and long term in the industry. Eric Bischoff has credited with the division as becoming a defining feature of Monday Nitro, that was as fundamental to WCW's mid-late 1990s popularity as the New World Order faction:

I think the cruiserweight division and the talent represented therein probably had as much to do with the success of Nitro as the nWo storyline and Hulk Hogan, Scott Hall, and Kevin Nash. I don’t think people recognize it. The talent in that division not only helped Nitro consistently defeat WWE...that talent forced WWE, as much as the nWo, to change the way they were presenting the product.

— Eric Bischoff, speaking in 2020

The Cruiserweight division would continue to directly influence North American wrestling for many decades. Following the acquisition of WCW by WWF/WWE in 2001, WWE revived the Cruiserweight division in 2002 to be a feature of its Smackdown brand, with the WWE Cruiserweight Championship being deemed by the promotion to be the direct lineal successor to the WCW title. Simultaneously, the newly formed Total Nonstop Action wrestling promotion heavily featured their X Division, which did not limit participants by weight but rather by style. Nonetheless, the X-Division was considered a direct spiritual successor to the style developed in the WCW Cruiserweight division and became influential in its own right. WWE and TNA/Impact have continued to experiment and use the Cruiserweight/X-Division concept on and off throughout the 2000s and 2010s and into the 2020s.

== Legacy ==
WCW was extremely influential within professional wrestling in the 1990s and several elements innovated and introduced by WCW would continue to be used in professional wrestling even decades after its closure.

=== Short-term legacy ===
In the immediate aftermath of WWF's purchase of WCW, a significant portion of WCW's active roster was integrated into the WWF. These former WCW talents would be used as part of a "WCW vs WWF" storyline that ran in the WWF throughout 2001. The storyline began proper at the WWF Invasion pay-per-view, which received 775,000 buys and became one of the highest-grossing wrestling pay-per-views of all time. Although WWF was able to recruit many of those on the WCW roster at the time of the purchase, it was unable to secure the use of most of its top-level stars, as they were signed to long-term contracts with AOL-Time Warner rather than WCW. As such, these stars could remain inactive but still continue to be paid, and were not incentivized to join WWF until those contracts expired. It would not be until 2002 onwards that headline WCW stars such as Goldberg or Scott Steiner would join the company. At the No Way Out pay-per-view in February 2002, WWE began their own version of the new World order centered around Hogan, Nash and Hall, but later incorporating former WCW stars the Giant (now known as the Big Show) and Booker T as well as WWE talent such as Shawn Michaels.

Throughout the early 2000s, many former WCW headliners found it difficult to integrate into WWE, as there continued to be legitimate tensions between the two groups. Former WCW performers such as Diamond Dallas Page (who had accepted a WWF contract in 2001) were perceived to be intentionally poorly used as part of a "victory lap" by WWF. In turn, this dissuaded some WCW stars from trusting WWE; for example, Sting chose to remain out of WWE until 2014, and even when he did join, WWE was criticised for using Sting to perform yet another victory lap at WrestleMania 31.

After the closure of WCW, several new professional wrestling promotions would launch featuring former talent associated with WCW. The most prominent of these, Total Nonstop Action (TNA), was founded by Jeff Jarrett in 2002 and would attempt to take over WCW's market position in the mid-to-late 2000s using some former WCW stars such as Sting. TNA would also adopt their own version of the Cruiserweight division, branded as the X Division.

=== Long-term legacy ===
Throughout the 2000s, WWE would incorporate elements into their shows formerly associated with WCW. Former WCW Championships such as the WCW World Heavyweight Championship, the WCW United States Championship and the WCW Cruiserweight Championship would be reactivated in WWE, with their WCW lineages acknowledged. The Cruiserweight division concept was introduced to WWE in 2002 and since then has been used intermittently throughout the 2000s, 2010s and 2020s from 2002 onwards. Some WCW mainstays such as Booker T, Eddie Guerrero, Chris Benoit and Chris Jericho were able to achieve long-term top positions within WWE by the mid to late 2000s. Similarly, promotions such as Total Nonstop Action would also make use of former WCW talent when possible and also continued the legacy of the Cruiserweight with their X-Division.

WWE has since released various WCW documentaries, anthologies, and compilations, including The Rise and Fall of WCW, and a three volume series hosted by Diamond Dallas Page called The Very Best of WCW Monday Nitro. WCW's library content would be made available with the launch of WWE Network in 2014. WWE launched a YouTube channel devoted entirely to WCW content on March 6, 2025.

WWE would revive several of WCW's events, including Great American Bash in 2004, Starrcade in 2017 and Halloween Havoc in 2020. WWE also utilized the Night of Champions name and theme used on the last episode of Nitro beginning in 2001, which was later known as Clash of Champions, similarly named from WCW's Clash of the Champions. In 2017, WWE held its first annual NXT WarGames event for its NXT brand, with that's year's event featuring the first WarGames match since the September 4, 2000, episode of Nitro.

In 2019, new promotion All Elite Wrestling (AEW) formed a partnership with WarnerMedia to air their flagship show, AEW Dynamite, on TNT, returning professional wrestling to the network for the first time since WCW's closure. On January 5, 2022, Dynamite moved to TNT's sibling network, TBS, marking the first time TBS has aired wrestling programming since the March 21, 2001, episode of WCW Thunder. TNT has also broadcast AEW's second show, AEW Rampage, that ran from August 13, 2021, until December 27, 2024, and added another AEW show with the June 17, 2023, debut of AEW Collision.

In 2020, AEW revived WCW's Bash at the Beach series of shows with AEW Bash at the Beach on January 15, 2020. However, a lawsuit by WWE prevented further reuse of that branding. Beginning in 2021, AEW began presenting their own version of WCW's WarGames match, held at the AEW Blood & Guts event.

Who Killed WCW?, a four-part documentary series based on the downfall of WCW premiered June 6, 2024 on Vice TV. The series was presented by Dwayne Johnson and featured former WCW personalities including Bill Goldberg, Eric Bischoff, Bret Hart, Booker T, Kevin Nash, amongst others.

== Championships ==
Championship	Notes
NWA Western States Heritage Championship	A National Wrestling Alliance (NWA) championship intended for mid-card wrestlers. It was created under Jim Crockett Promotions (JCP) in 1987 and used in WCW until it was retired in 1989.
NWA World Heavyweight Championship	The world title of the NWA. It was defended within WCW from 1988 until 1993.
NWA World Six-Man Tag Team Championship	The title was established under the Chicago territory of the NWA in 1955 and defended within WCW from 1988 to 1989.
NWA World Tag Team Championship	The world tag team title of the NWA. It was defended within WCW from 1992 through 1993.
WCW Cruiserweight Championship	The title was established under WCW in 1996 and would continue to be used after WCW's purchase by the World Wrestling Federation (WWF, now WWE) until March 2008, when it was retired as the WWE Cruiserweight Championship.
WCW Cruiserweight Tag Team Championship	The title was established on March 18, 2001, but was retired eight days later after WCW's purchase by the WWF.
WCW Light Heavyweight Championship	The title was established in 1991 and was defended until September 1992, when the title was retired.
WCW Hardcore Championship	The title was established in 1999 and was defended until January 2001, when Meng jumped to the WWF as champion. The title was retired later that year due to WCW being bought by the WWF.
WCW International World Heavyweight Championship	The secondary world title of WCW. It was established in 1993 under WCW International, a fictitious subsidiary of WCW, and was defended until 1994 when it was unified with the WCW World Heavyweight Championship.
WCW United States Heavyweight Championship	The second highest ranked title used in WCW. It was established in 1975 under JCP and would continue to be used after WCW's purchase by the WWF until November 2001, when it was unified with the WWF Intercontinental Championship. Under WWE, the title was revived as the WWE United States Championship in 2003.
WCW United States Tag Team Championship	The title was established in 1986 under JCP and was defended within WCW until July 1992, when the title was retired.
WCW Women's Championship	The title was established under WCW in 1996 and was defended in Gaea Japan until 1998 when the title was retired.
WCW Women's Cruiserweight Championship	The title was established in 1997 but was retired the following year.
WCW World Heavyweight Championship	The primary world title of WCW. It was established in 1991 under WCW and would continue to be used after WCW's purchase by the WWF until December 2001, when it was unified with the WWF Championship at Vengeance. The Big Gold Belt, which represented the championship, continued to appear until April 2002 when the new Undisputed WWF Championship belt was introduced.
WCW World Six-Man Tag Team Championship	The title was established in February 1991 and defended until December 1991, when it was retired.
WCW World Tag Team Championship	The world tag team title of WCW. It was established in 1975 under JCP and would continue to be used after WCW's purchase by the WWF until November 2001, when it was unified with the WWF Tag Team Championship.
WCW World Television Championship	The title was established in 1974 under JCP and was defended within WCW until April 2000, when the title was retired.

== Programming ==
Program	Start date	End date	Notes
WCW Pro	January 11, 1958	September 27, 1998	Also known as WCW Pro Wrestling, NWA Pro Wrestling, and Mid-Atlantic Championship Wrestling
WCW Saturday Night	December 25, 1971	August 19, 2000	Also known as WCW Saturday Morning, World Championship Wrestling, and Georgia Championship Wrestling
Best of World Championship Wrestling	1973	1987	Also known as Best of Championship Wrestling
WCW WorldWide	October 8, 1975	April 1, 2001	Also known as WCW World Wide Wrestling, NWA World Wide Wrestling, and World Wide Wrestling
WCW Clash of the Champions	March 27, 1988	August 21, 1997	Also known as NWA Clash of the Champions
WCW Main Event	January 21, 1988	January 3, 1998	Also known as NWA Main Event
WCW Power Hour	June 23, 1989	March 5, 1994	Also known as NWA Power Hour
WCW All Nighter	March 6, 1994	January 10, 1995	
WCW Prime	February 6, 1995	October 14, 1996	Final episode presented as WCW Wrestling
WCW Monday Nitro	September 4, 1995	March 26, 2001	
WCW Thunder	January 8, 1998	March 21, 2001	

== In other media ==
WCW had a presence in NASCAR from the mid-1990s to 2000, sponsoring the #29 team in the Busch Grand National Series full-time and the #9 Melling Racing team in the Winston Cup Series part-time. In 1996, Kyle Petty's #49 car in the Busch Grand National series was sponsored by the nWo, and Wally Dallenbach Jr. briefly drove a WCW-sponsored car for Galaxy Motorsports. Ready to Rumble, a film based on WCW directed by Brian Robbins and starring David Arquette, Scott Caan, and Oliver Platt was released by Warner Bros. in 2000.

Several WCW video games were made in the 1980s, 1990s and early 2000s, including WCW Wrestling, WCW SuperBrawl Wrestling, WCW vs. the World, WCW vs. nWo: World Tour, WCW Nitro, WCW/nWo Thunder, WCW/nWo Revenge, WCW Mayhem, and WCW Backstage Assault. A game for the Game.com, WCW Whiplash, was announced but never released.
