= Spaving =

Spending money to access savings

Spaving is a marketing strategy where consumers are encouraged to spend money to gain access to savings. Common spaving tactics include discounts, sales, and promotions such as free shipping at a certain threshold and buy one, get one free. The term is a portmanteau of the words spending and saving. The concept has been popularized by online retailers and social media.

Spaving has been criticized as a financial pitfall causing consumers to purchase more than needed and creating excessive buying habits.

Consumers engage in spaving due to fear of missing out and loss aversion. Consumers who excessively engage in spaving are referred to as spavers.
