= Patrick James McGinnis =

American venture capitalist and author

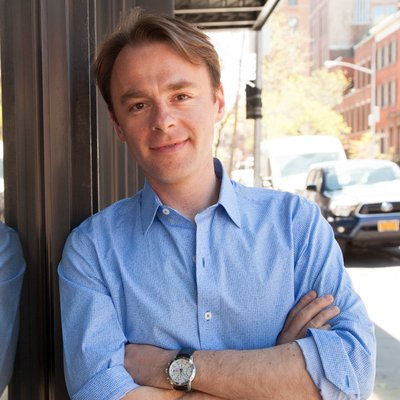
- Education: Harvard Business School; Georgetown University
- Occupations: Venture capitalist; author
- Known for: FOMO
- Notable work: The 10% Entrepreneur
- Website: www.patrickmcginnis.com

Patrick James McGinnis is an American venture capitalist and author. He is best known for coining the term "fear of missing out" (FOMO), which he first used in an op-ed for The Harbus in 2004 while studying at the Harvard Business School. In 2016, he published a book entitled The 10% Entrepreneur: Live Your Startup Dream Without Quitting Your Day Job.

Prior to enrolling at Harvard, McGinnis studied at Georgetown University. In 2010, he founded an independent advisory firm known as Dirigo Advisors, which works with investors and businesses operating primarily in Latin America. He previously worked as the Vice President of PineBridge Investments (formerly AIG Capital Partners). In 2014, he co-authored a policy research working paper from the World Bank entitled Private Equity and Venture Capital in SMEs in Developing Countries : The Role for Technical Assistance.

== Books ==
- The 10% Entrepreneur: Live Your Startup Dream Without Quitting Your Day Job. Portfolio. 2016. ISBN 978-1591848097.
- Fear Of Missing Out: Practical Decision-Making in a World of Overwhelming Choice. Sourcebooks. 2020. ISBN 978-1492694946.
