= WCW All Nighter =

Professional wrestling television program

- Created by: World Championship Wrestling
- Country of origin: United States
- No. of episodes: 2

Production
- Running time: 6 hours (with commercials)

Original release
- Network: TBS
- Release: March 6, 1994 – January 21, 1995

WCW All Nighter is a series of late night specials that aired on TBS from March 6, 1994 to January 21, 1995.

== WCW All Nighter (March 6, 1994) ==
Originally aired March 6, 1994 from midnight until 6am. All matches except for one on this broadcast were from previous editions of Clash of the Champions.

The event was hosted by Tony Schiavone, Bobby Heenan, Gene Okerlund, Chris Cruise, Gordon Solie, Eric Bischoff, and Larry Zbyszko, from Schiavone's house.

Matches showcased were:

- Ric Flair (c) vs. Sting for the NWA World Heavyweight Championship from Clash of the Champions I
- Ric Flair (c) vs. Ricky Steamboat in a two-out-of-three falls match for the NWA World Heavyweight Championship from Clash of the Champions VI
- Lex Luger (c) vs. Ric Flair for the NWA United States Championship from Clash of the Champions XII
- Ric Flair vs. Terry Funk in an "I Quit" match from Clash of the Champions IX
- Ric Flair and Sting vs. The Great Muta and Terry Funk in a Thunderdome match from Halloween Havoc (1989)
- Ric Flair and Barry Windham vs. The Midnight Express (Bobby Eaton and Stan Lane) from Clash of the Champions IV
- Shane Douglas and Ricky Steamboat (c) vs. Brian Pillman and Steve Austin for the NWA World Tag Team Championship and WCW World Tag Team Championship from Clash of the Champions XXII
- Steve Austin vs. Brian Pillman from Clash of the Champions XXV
- The Road Warriors (Hawk and Animal) vs. The Samoan Swat Team (Samu and Fatu) from Clash of the Champions VIII
- Enforcers (Arn Anderson and Larry Zbyszko) (c) vs. Dustin Rhodes and Ricky Steamboat for the WCW World Tag Team Championship from Clash of the Champions XVII
- Cactus Jack vs. Van Hammer from Clash of the Champions XVII

Dave Meltzer of the Wrestling Observer reviewed the first special favorably, writing, "all the announcers were pretty funny and the matches, most shown in their entirety, were mainly classics". According to Meltzer, the Nielsen rating for the special was 1.2 and impressed TBS enough to consider making it an annual event.

== WCW All Night 2 ==
Originally aired at midnight on Saturday morning January 21, 1995. In June 2010, the show became available as part of WWE Classics on Demand. The show was added to the WWE Network September 12, 2019 as a Hidden Gem.

The show opened with Tony Schiavone, Bobby Heenan, Larry Zbyszko, Gene Okerlund, Gordon Solie and Dusty Rhodes in the Omni Hotel in Atlanta.

During the broadcast, they counted down the 10 best Clash of the Champions matches:

- 10 - Steve Austin (c) vs. Ricky Steamboat for the WCW United States Heavyweight Championship from Clash of the Champions XXVIII
- 9 - Big Van Vader (c) vs. Davey Boy Smith for the WCW World Heavyweight Championship from Clash of the Champions XXIV
- 8 - Big Van Vader vs. Dustin Rhodes from Clash of the Champions XXIX
- 7 - Hulk Hogan (c) vs. Ric Flair for the WCW World Heavyweight Championship from Clash of the Champions XXVIII
- 6 - Steve Austin vs. Brian Pillman from Clash of the Champions XXV
- 5 - Enforcers (Arn Anderson and Larry Zbyszko) (c) vs. Dustin Rhodes and Ricky Steamboat for the WCW World Tag Team Championship from Clash of the Champions XVII
- 4 - Ricky Steamboat (c) vs. Ric Flair in a Two-out-of-three falls match for the NWA World Heavyweight Championship from Clash of the Champions VI
- 3 - Arn Anderson and Tully Blanchard (c) vs. Sting and Dusty Rhodes for the NWA World Tag Team Championship from Clash of the Champions II
- 2 - Ric Flair vs. Terry Funk in an "I Quit" match from Clash of the Champions IX
- 1 - Ric Flair (c) vs. Sting for the NWA World Heavyweight Championship from Clash of the Champions I

In between matches 9 and 8, a match between The Gladiators vs. The Mulkeys was shown from World Championship Wrestling, March 30, 1987. They then showed Hulk Hogan (c) vs. Ric Flair for the WCW World Heavyweight Championship in a steel cage match from Halloween Havoc (1994).

In between matches 5 and 4, Ric Flair & Barry Windham vs. Eddie Gilbert & Ricky Steamboat was shown from World Championship Wrestling January 21, 1989. This was followed by Ric Flair vs. Ricky Steamboat from WCW Main Event July 24, 1994.

In between matches 3 and 2, The Road Warriors (Animal and Hawk) vs. The Steiner Brothers (Rick Steiner and Scott Steiner) from Starrcade 1989 was shown.

In between matches 2 and 1, Sting vs. Lex Luger for the WCW World Heavyweight Championship from SuperBrawl II was shown.
