= Hunger marketing =

Marketing strategy targeting human emotions

Hunger marketing is a marketing strategy that targets the emotions of human beings. The essence of hunger marketing is artificially low price and/or restricted supply.

It encourages impulsive decision-making over rationality, using product scarcity as a driving force. According to research, product scarcity captures consumer interest, enhances the product's perceived value, and promotes innovative product usage.

== Related concepts ==
=== Rational decision making ===
Rational decision making refers to individuals who possess all necessary information to make informed decisions and are not in need. Usually, consumers aim to acquire the most valuable items at reasonable prices. To do so, they evaluate and calculate factors such as benefits and cost. If consumers approach this process through rational decision making, they can secure the best deals at affordable rates.

=== Emotional decision making ===
Emotional decision making, in contrast, occurs when individuals make choices based on intuition or feelings, often without careful consideration. Because individuals are influenced by numerous stimuli, they may make impulsive decisions. This may lead to a lack of knowledge concerning alternative options, insufficient time to research or calculate, and unreasonable thinking. Consequently, many businesses aim to encourage irrational spending.

== Techniques ==
Three representative techniques of hunger marketing are described below: limited stock, time limit, and special discounts.

=== Limited stock ===
Limited stock represents a prominent example of "hunger marketing" and directly and profoundly impacts consumers as one of the strongest causal factors. Many companies have not adequately supplied their products, leading consumers to perceive them as high-quality and popular due to their scarcity. This strategy often results in increased reputation. Xiaomi employs a strong strategy of inadequate supply to facilitate efficient inventory management, control shipping costs, and stimulate demand. By limiting their supply, companies can create rumors that the item they sell is exceptional and increase its value and price. People waiting in long lines or a product selling out in a short time give the illusion that the item is extraordinary. This statement is subjective and lacks objective evidence to support these claims.

=== Time limit ===
Time limits are a prevalent technique in hunger marketing, with a significant impact on consumption. It serves as one of the direct stimuli to consumers and is implemented on various home shopping and internet shopping sites. QVC, one of the leading home shopping websites, employs a banner on their first page that reads "Ends in time", which is time-limited with a comment, and 'Today's special value' to attract consumer attention. Additionally, phrases like "Almost sold out!" or "We are about to terminate selling!" are used. "In a minute!" is a common phrase seen on home shopping, flight, and hotel websites, used to pique the interest of customers. Companies also utilize time limitation strategies, such as "Only 10 items left" or "Time limit for this product," in order to attract attention. These strategies are frequently combined with special discount offers, such as "Up to 50% off, today only." In fact, by limiting the availability of their products, they create the impression in consumers that this is a unique purchasing opportunity.

=== Special discounts ===
Special discounts are a powerful tool for hunger marketing, and they can significantly influence a person's consumption behavior. Often, people will feel compelled to purchase a product simply because it is being offered at a discount, even if they had not previously planned to do so. This phenomenon is commonly observed in outlet stores or at establishments such as TK Maxx. Special discounts are a powerful tool for hunger marketing, and they can significantly influence a person's consumption behavior. Additionally, individuals may unexpectedly purchase flight and hotel tickets while browsing the web due to the appeal of a special discount. It is well-known that consumers are price-sensitive, and many marketing strategies take advantage of this fact. Various studies have explored how people react to special discounts and to influence consumers' emotions, many companies emphasize their discounted prices. Customers tend to have a strong emotional response to these types of price reductions and are highly influenced by them. An experiment revealed that individuals who received a significant discount reported higher levels of happiness compared to those who only received change during the experiment. Exclude subjective evaluations unless marked as such, avoid biased or ornamental language, and ensure precision in word choice. Ensure a clear and logical flow of information with appropriate causal connections between statements.

== Examples ==
=== Xiaomi and Apple ===
Xiaomi, the third largest smartphone company globally, is known for its hunger marketing approach, which Apple also employs.

An article touted Xiaomi's latest smartphone, the Mi Note 2, as "Sold out in just 50 seconds!" generating more interest in the product. With each new release, Xiaomi consistently sets new sales time records. Their new product is exclusively available for purchase on their official website. By controlling their supply in this way, Xiaomi can regulate product availability. Pre-registered individuals have the opportunity to purchase the product before it is released in any given country. This allows for global reactions to the product's unveiling. Those who purchase the product are encouraged to leave comments online, which are accessible to individuals worldwide. This creates a sense of curiosity surrounding the new item.

=== Black Friday ===
Black Friday is a time when consumers feel compelled to purchase items due to the large discounts offered by many stores. This shopping frenzy is often created by businesses instilling a sense of urgency in customers. As Thanksgiving approaches, companies accentuate the occasion with significant discounts and encourage consumption. Moreover, during this time, stores offer additional benefits such as giveaways, free gift-wrapping, and even complimentary shipping services. Due to this evidence, individuals react to stimuli and accumulate wealth by spending their money unexpectedly.
