= Sleep deprivation in higher education =

Health issue in students

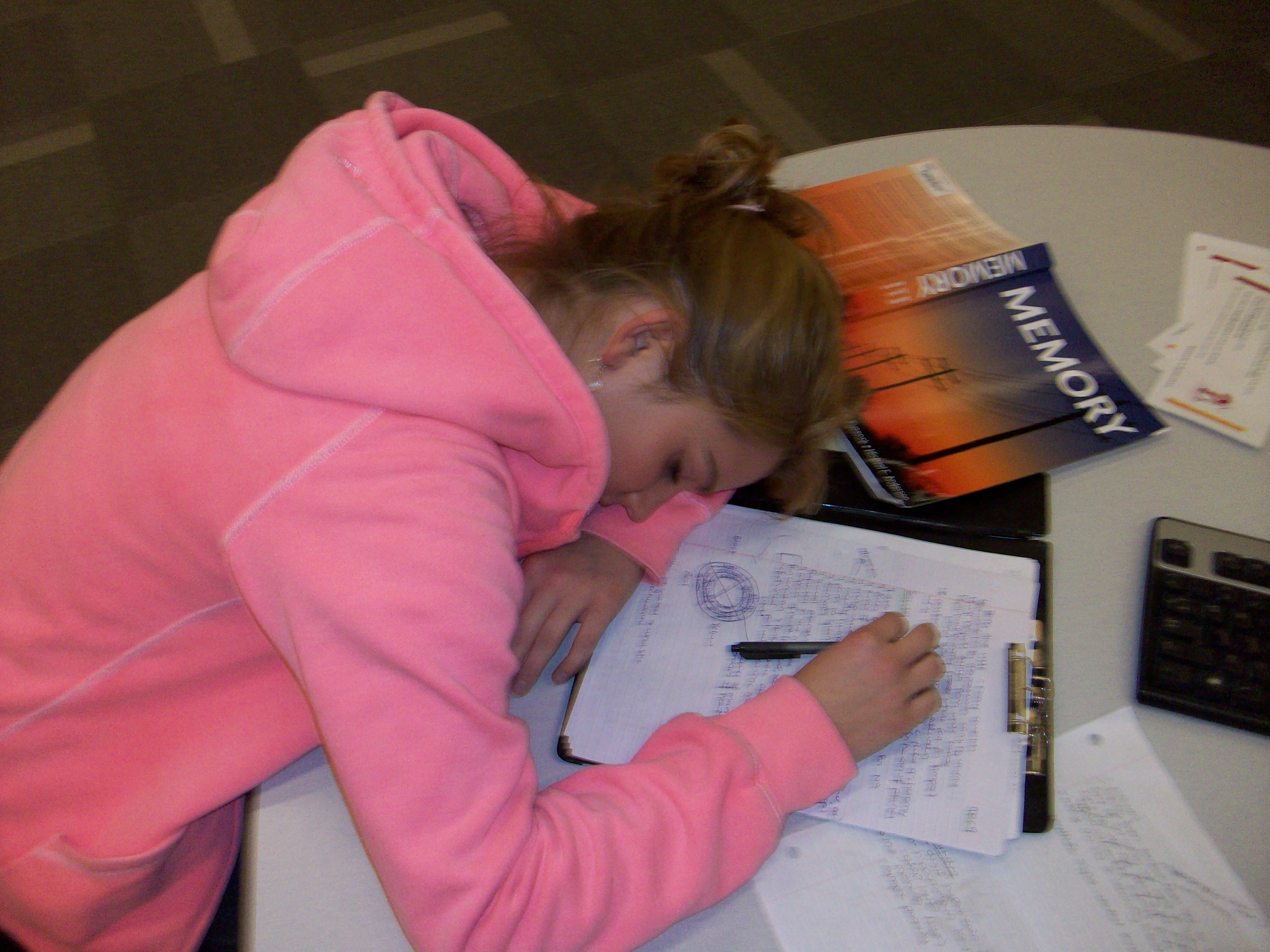
Typical example of a sleep deprived college student who is unable to concentrate on her studies, leading to impaired learning and decreased academic performance

Sleep deprivation – the condition of not having enough sleep – is a common health issue for students in higher education. This issue has several underlying and negative consequences, but there are a few helpful improvements that students can make to reduce its frequency and severity.

On average, university students get 6 to 6.9 hours of sleep every night. Based on the Treatment for Sleep Disorders, the recommended amount of sleep needed for college students is around 8 hours. According to Stanford University's Department for the Diagnosis, 68% of college students are not getting the sleep they need. The main causes of sleep deprivation include poor sleep hygiene, biology, use of technology, and use of drugs. The effects can damage the student's GPA, relationships, focus and memory, and emotional and mental health. Students may face depression, anxiety, and difficulty maintaining their relationships in a healthy manner. There are many possible solutions to combat sleep deprivation including improving bedroom environment, reducing exposure to blue light, and taking naps during the day.

== Background ==
Centers for Disease Control and Prevention (CDC) recommendations for the amount of sleep needed decrease with age. While sleep quantity is important, good sleep quality is also essential to avoid sleep disorders.

The term sleep deprivation can be defined as having a lack of sleep that does not support daytime awareness. In most literature, sleep deprivation is further categorized into either acute sleep deprivation or chronic partial sleep deprivation. Chronic partial sleep deprivation is a form of sleep deprivation caused when one obtains some but inadequate sleep. Acute sleep deprivation is more widely known as the scenario in which one is awake for 24 hours or longer.

From student reports, 70.65% of students are sleep deprived and 50% of college students exhibit daytime sleepiness. Additionally, only 4% of students obtain 7 hours of sleep or more. The average was 5.7 hours of sleep and students on average pull 2.7 "all-nighters" per month. Note that "all-nighters" is the term used when one does not sleep throughout the entire night.

A young adult university student sleeping; insufficient sleep is common among university students.

== Causes ==
=== Sleep hygiene ===
Inadequate sleep hygiene is one reason why college students specifically experience sleep deprivation. Sleep hygiene is defined as habits or practices that allow for healthy amounts of sleep on a daily basis. Good sleep hygiene habits include keeping a consistent sleep schedule, having a quiet sleep environment, avoiding the consumption of caffeine after lunch, and minimizing alcohol consumption before bed. A study published in 2018 on the Journal of Clinical Sleep Medicine found that over the course of 8 weeks, college students that partook in sleep hygiene education had improved sleep quality. Being consistent in these habits can lead to increased daytime energy level, improved mood, enhanced immune system function, and decreased stress. With college students, consistency is often hard; this idea is very prevalently shown in regard to sleep hygiene. Late night studying, meetings, roommates, socializing/social events, etc. all can cause a student's sleep schedule and environment to be inconsistent on a day-to-day basis and allow an opportunity for disruptions such as alcohol before bed.

=== Technology ===
Using technology before falling asleep can affect a student's sleep pattern. The blue light that is emitted from the screens of cell phones, computers, and other devices stops the production of melatonin, a hormone that controls the sleep-wake cycle of the circadian rhythm. This reduction of the amount of melatonin produced makes it harder to fall and stay asleep. The National Sleep Foundation conducted a poll in 2011 and reported that approximately 90% of Americans used technology in the hour before bed. The poll noted that young adults and teenagers, such as college students, were more likely to use cell phones, computers, and video game consoles than other adults. Furthermore, 22% of participants reported going to sleep with cell phone ringers on in their bedroom and 10% reported awakenings in at least a few nights per week due to their cell phones' ringers. Among those with the cell phone ringers on, being awakened by their cell phone was directly correlated to difficulty sustaining sleep.

According to Elizabeth B. Dowdell and Brianne Q. Clayton, sleep-deprived college students performed significantly worse on cognitive skills than peers who had adequate. Furthermore, the sleep-deprived students were not aware of the extent to which sleep deprivation negatively affects their ability to complete cognitive tasks. Research has shown that individuals with excessive technology use in the bedroom have later bedtimes and tend to sleep later in the morning. The reliance on technology in the bedroom, which should be associated only with sleep, creates difficulty separating waking and sleeping activities. When measuring the amount of sleep during the week compared to the weekend, students with four or more technological devices in their bedroom had significantly less sleep compared to those with three or fewer devices. Since many students do not utilize the do not disturb mode or silence their phones at night, each notification and alert from their phones disrupts their sleep in terms of quality and duration.

=== Circadian rhythm ===
Several recent studies have shown that adolescents undergo a change in their circadian rhythm which shifts sleep times later into the night. This change seems to occur during puberty, extending well into adulthood. The delay in sleep cycles clashes with the structured early morning schedules of students due to early classes or work; thus, the total amount of sleep time is greatly reduced. This imbalance in circadian rhythm can lead to extremely harmful affects on students' learning and memory processes as well. This is largely in part because circadian rhythm has a "master clock" that is located in the same part of the brain that is responsible for forming memories, learning, and emotions. There has been a push in many educational systems for a later start time to help increase the available time for sleep in adolescents due to these biological changes. Additionally, many college students have jobs that increase the length of time they spend awake. Some may have class most of the day then work most of the night, or vice versa. Either one of these would be enough to change their already-established circadian rhythm, resulting in feeling sleepy when they should be awake and wide-awake when they should be asleep.

=== Scheduling ===
Many college students have variable day-to-day class schedules that change one's daily routine. Additionally, many college campuses offer late night social activities that can begin as late as 10 pm. These activities are crucial for college students because they allow socialization and bonding with one another, which may boost one's mood. Similarly, many organizations such as fraternities and sororities on college campuses hold events and fundraisers that often occur late and/or throughout the night, and are often mandatory obligations. Having to work or attend an event in the middle of the night can cause someone's sleep schedule to be disrupted for the entire day and possibly into the next day. Some students may have to go to class most of the day then work most of the night, or vice versa. Even beyond that, students have to find a way to balance scheduling time for normal friends, family, and any other relationships. On top of this, many students live with roommates and/or near neighbors that might not adhere to the same sleep schedule, thus disrupting theirs. All of this doesn't even include extra activities like appointments, meetings, etc. that take up even more of the day.

=== Stimulants ===
Stimulants increase the time it takes to fall asleep as well as suppress REM (rapid eye movement) sleep states. Those who use stimulants report worse sleep qualities, like increased sleep onset latency and reduced sleep efficiency due to stimulants' ability to block dopamine reuptake, stimulate dopamine release, or both. Through a study conducted within 119 colleges and universities across the US, 6.9% of stimulants used present a lifetime prevalence for students, potentially meaning a lifetime prevalence of sleep disruption. Men are more likely to use stimulants, caffeine, and energy drinks, though women are more likely to use stimulants solely for the purpose of energy. Non-prescribed use of stimulants can increase the use of alcohol, cocaine, and marijuana.

=== Caffeine ===
A study from the University of Kentucky showed that more than 78% of college freshmen consume above the recommended amount of caffeine each day. One-tenth of the US population already suffers from insomnia, and in turn caffeine is often used as a countermeasure for the side effects associated with this lack of sleep. However, consuming large amounts of caffeine (versus consuming light or no caffeine) is associated with higher insomnia symptoms and daytime sleepiness. In a study from the Henry Ford Hospital's Sleep and Research Center and Wayne State College of Medicine, they discovered that caffeine consumed within six hours of bedtime can significantly disrupt sleep. Participants in this study who consumed caffeine right before bedtime, three hours before bedtime, and six hours before bedtime all experienced a shorter night's sleep, lower sleep quality, and spent more time awake at night.

College students often drink coffee as their source of caffeine. 2-4 cups of coffee at night can increase the time it takes to fall asleep to nearly twice the normal amount. The average time takes to fall asleep is roughly 6.3 minutes, but with caffeine this time is increased to 12.1 minutes. Energy drinks are also a widely used form of caffeine due to their wide availability and evolving promises to meet all kinds of needs, such as improved academic or mental performance. The caffeine in energy drinks is what is primarily responsible for the increase of energy. Each drink varies widely between 45–500 mg of caffeine. 34% of 18-24-year-olds consume energy drinks regularly. 67% of users consume energy drinks to compensate for the lack of sleep. Additionally, energy drinks are associated with the higher risk of alcohol, drug, and stimulant usage, as well as increased insomnia symptoms, specifically in people with higher levels of baseline anxiety.

=== Adderall ===
Adderall is a drug that affects the central nervous system and is prescribed to individuals with attention deficit hyperactivity disorder (ADHD) and/or narcolepsy. This drug is commonly misused by college students as a "study drug," although research suggests that stimulants are more efficient at correcting shortfalls than enhancing performance. Adderall is a highly abused substance among students in higher education because it prevents the reuptake of dopamine, allowing college students to stay up all day or night and remain alert. The effects of recreational use are exhaustion and an accumulation of "sleep debt." When you sleep fewer hours than your body needs, you acquire this "sleep debt," which adds up over time and negatively impacts your health. The effects of this debt can be loss of focus, difficulty processing and storing new information, and eventually as debt accumulates, hypertension, diabetes mellitus, coronary heart disease, obesity, and cardiovascular diseases. Furthermore, frequent use of adderall during the day and night can lead to extended sleep deprivation and insomnia.

=== Alcohol ===
College students who consume moderate to severe amounts of alcohol are increasingly likely to face lower quality of sleep. However, 11.6% of students use alcohol as a sleep aid. A study published in Behavioral Sleep Medicine showed that significant alcohol use can lead to "lower sleep duration, greater sleep schedule irregularity, bedtime delay, weekend oversleeping, and sleep-related impairment." Furthermore, increasing alcohol consumption may lead to the student falling asleep faster, but facing significant sleep disturbance. Alcohol use decreases REM sleep, so a student who consumes alcohol may sleep for the normal 7–8 hours, but the sleep quality will be lower than an individual who was sober. Additionally, consumption of alcohol can increase the chances of developing obstructive sleep apnea. Roughly 4 out 5 college students drink alcohol. 40% of men and women reported binge drinking 4-5 drinks in a row within the past 2 weeks. Even binge drinking once can actually alter the gene that regulates sleep, resulting in sleep disturbance.

Mattress Quality

Mattress quality can have major impacts on the sleep quality of college students. Mattresses can negatively affect sleep quality due to the back pain that comes with having poor mattress quality. Poor mattress quality can be the cause of back and neck pain as well as deteriorating the health of young adults struggling with sleep deprivation. When mattress quality directly affects sleep quality, other negative effects can occur such as a lack of work productivity and an increase in injury rates due to sleepiness. A study on mattress firmness measured the total sleep period and total sleep time for participants sleeping on a soft, medium firm, and firm mattress. The study showed that participants who slept on a medium firm mattress experienced higher and more consistent sleep efficiency, while the sleep efficiency of the participants sleeping on a soft mattress or a very firm mattress showed more inconsistent patterns with sleep quality.

== Effects ==
=== Physical ===
==== Sleep cycles ====
Irregular sleep schedules can cause negative impacts on learning, memory, and performance. The dual process theory determines that certain types of memory depend on specific sleep states, like REM and NREM (Non-Rem) states. REM sleep deprivation can reduce sleep-induced improvement such as visual perception, thus influencing how one learns. REM sleep occurs every 90–120 minutes, which is roughly 4-5 times a night. REM periods of sleep increase in time with every cycle. Thus, when college students sleep less, they do not attain the last 1-2 REM cycles and in turn that affects their procedural memory.

==== Attention and memory ====
Even if a student is staying awake in class, their ability to truly pay attention is severely diminished. 23.2% of students who do not get enough sleep every night report that they have trouble being able to concentrate on things. Scientists have found that sleep deprivation leads to lower alertness and concentration, resulting in becoming confused more easily. Because of this, the ability to perform tasks requiring complex thought or logical reasoning is diminished. Not being able to concentrate or think logically in class may cause the student to struggle on learning the material, which can in turn lead to increased sleep deprivation from spending more time on homework.

Lack of sleep also affects the formation of memories. Studies show REM sleep is involved in creating memories related to complex information and "students not getting enough sleep will have trouble committing their classes material to memory and learn slower". Forgetfulness is another symptom of sleep deprivation which can be immensely harmful, especially during an exam when memory is crucial. Without adequate sleep, the neurons "can no longer function to coordinate information properly, and students lose the ability to access previously learned information." A study of graduate pharmacy students showed 81.7% of students failed to get 7 hours of sleep on the night before an examination.

==== Drowsiness ====
Sleep deprivation causes drowsiness, which can affect students in higher education. Drowsiness can affect students in their classes and poses a risk for those who commute by car to their college campuses. Many students commute by car to their classes from their homes; at the Ohio State University, close to 30% of students commute. Individuals with less than 6 hours of sleep are the most likely to fall asleep at the wheel and with the average university students getting that amount of sleep, the dangers are a real factor for students. Once a student makes it to class, sleep deprivation will affect their ability to stay awake throughout the class. Over 50% of students have fallen asleep in class.

==== Eating ====
Less sleep can lead to weight gain and obesity due to decreases in the body's energy expenditure and ability to stop eating once full. When sleeping, leptin levels rise, telling the brain that our body's energy reserves are adequate and we do not need to eat more (i.e suppresses appetite). Without sleep, this level cannot rise, allowing ghrelin to rise instead and rather appetite is increased. Combining this with the already inadequate diets of college students due to time and monetary constraints can combine to result in weight gain in college students. Weight gain in first year college students is a well known phenomenon called the "Freshman 15" in the US or the "Fresher Five" in Australia or New Zealand.

=== Emotional ===
==== Mental health ====
Insufficient sleep affects students mood by increasing irritability and negatively affecting their emotions. Research shows that sleep deprivation increases amygdala activity which is linked to negative emotions like anger and rage. This can make coping with even minor stressors more difficult and negatively impact our ability to accurately perceive the world. Anxiety is another symptom of sleep loss experienced by students. Lack of sleep amplifies anxiety in people who already experience increased levels of worry. A survey of college students in 2018 showed 63% of students felt "overwhelming anxiety." Depression has also been linked to sleeplessness. In a study of 1,000 young adults those with sleep issues were four times more likely to develop depression. These symptoms are two-directional. Anxiety and depression have been shown to cause sleeplessness, meaning these symptoms can be compound.

==== Relationships ====
The effects of sleeplessness also affect relationships among college students. An Ohio State University study showed that couples that obtained less than 7 hours of sleep interacted in a more hostile way. They also are less successful at resolving conflicts when they do come up. This is an effect from the irritability and impaired decision-making exhibited by students with sleep deprivation. Sleep deprivation also has been shown to reduce feelings of gratitude, which is an integral part of a healthy relationship. Similarly, it can also increase feelings of loneliness and rejection, even if it is not the reality of the relationship.

Mood

Sleep deprivation has been found to affect mood as well. This effect is most pronounced in those that are consistently partially sleep deprived, which is the case for many college students. A meta-analysis of several studies regarding sleep deprivation suggests that the effects of partial sleep deprivation are underestimated. Sleep problems and/or sleep deprivation have been shown to decrease functional emotional regulation and impair emotion generation. It can also decrease our levels of empathy and ability to react, making us more prejudiced when tired.

=== Academic ===
==== GPA ====
Inadequate sleep has been shown to affect student's GPA by up to a .02 drop for every night of the week a student sleeps poorly. Students who obtained 9 hours or more of sleep received a GPA of 3.24. Meanwhile those who had 6 hours or more of sleep received a 2.74 GPA. Among first-year university students, their GPA decreases by 0.115-0.132 for every hour that their sleep schedule is shortened. The effects of poor sleep are similar to that of binge drinking or abusive relationships on students' GPA along with their likeliness to drop one or more classes. The previously mentioned symptoms of inadequate sleep contribute to the drop in GPA. Consequences span from lack of focus to decreased motivation which leads to less hours of studying.

Students with sleep disorders are more likely to not perform well academically. Students with a GPA of 2.0 or lower were at a higher risk for sleep disorders. 30% of those who received positive results for obstructive sleep apnea were at risk for academic failure. Obstructive sleep apnea has shown to influence cognitive function in both children and adults. Other sleep disorders also present a higher risk for academic failure: 22% of those with insomnia, 21% with restless leg syndrome/periodic limb movement disorder, 26% with circadian rhythm sleep disorder, and 21% with hypersomnia.

==== Social withdrawal ====
Sleep deprivation may lead to social withdrawal due to increased feelings of loneliness and social isolation. The less sleep we get, the less we want to socially interact. However, social interaction is an important part of the lives of students in higher education to remain emotionally stable. Intrapersonal distress and self-reported loneliness have been linked to worse sleep quality. Over 64% of students in a 2017 study surveying 48,000 college students stated that they had felt lonely in the past year. Loss of sleep leads to a neural behavioral phenotype of social withdrawal and loneliness that can be easily perceived by others, in turn making one more lonely. The lack of social interaction has also been linked to higher levels of anxiety and depression, which can negatively affect students. Social withdrawal also negatively affects college students' social lives because when they feel drowsy they are less likely to seek out new experiences, which is an integral part of a student's time in higher education.

== Ways students in higher education can improve their sleep ==
=== Establishing circadian rhythm ===
Circadian rhythm is our bodies' system that internally monitors and regulates sleep and waking hours in a 24-hour period. Sleeping a consistent number of hours will reduce feelings of drowsiness throughout the day, especially due to the large amount of sleep necessary for students. Going to sleep at a consistent time and having a consistent routine can also be just as important as sleeping the same number of hours each night. Avoiding excess daytime napping, especially in the afternoon, is also a big part of a schedule that can help maintain regular circadian rhythm. Students with consistent sleeping schedules had better grades on average than students with irregular sleep schedules according to a study conducted by Brigham and Women's Hospital. Since circadian rhythm is a full 24-hour rhythm, it can also be beneficial to keep a regular meal and exercise schedule throughout the day. These schedule changes may impact circadian rhythm, and will take time for your body to adjust to.

Most modern technology with screens emit blue light, which has the ability to impact and shift circadian rhythms by tricking the body's response to normal changes in light. As stated previously, exposure to blue light has the ability to suppress melatonin, a hormone that helps prepare our body for sleep. Exposure in the early evening causes a delay to release that melatonin and therefore impacts our bodies' circadian rhythm by shifting it back. However, there are melatonin receptor agonists and melatonin supplements available that can be used to help establish a routine and get quality sleep. Additionally, caffeine, alcohol, nicotine, and medication with certain non-drowsy ingredients should be limited, especially near bedtime.

=== Naps ===
Napping can be an emergency measure used to help improve performance in the short term as well as supplement missing hours of sleep. Naps can have several purposes, most commonly to either prevent sleepiness or recover from sleepiness when working on a task. Naps should be 60 to 90 minutes for the greatest benefits but any longer may result in affecting a person's circadian rhythm. After napping, a person can wake with sleep inertia, where a person feels groggy or disoriented after waking.

Naps have positive short term effects, especially in improving performance and attention. A study conducted at the University of California, Riverside showed that participants performed similarly on an exam after a 90-minute nap compared to a full eight hours of sleep. Similarly, NASA conducted a study involving its pilots, where even a minimal 30 to 40-minute nap improved pilot's "performance by 34% and their alertness by 54%". In another study done by Lau, Alger and Fishbein showed that students who took a nap after studying were more likely to retain and recall what was learned. Both longer and short naps aided in memory retention of material.

=== Improving bedroom environment ===
Students can improve their bedroom environments to enhance how fast they fall asleep and better their sleep quality. Studies have shown that outside noise from traffic, students in dorms near them, or warmer temperatures within the bedroom negatively affect sleep. Another negative factor is the presence of outside light, which tricks our brain into thinking it is nearing daytime. It is possible for students to control these factors by changing the thermostat, blocking out sound, and darkening the bedroom. Harvard Medical School recommends keeping the bedroom between 60 °F (16 °C) and 75 °F (24 °C), using a white noise maker or earplugs, and using heavy "black-out" curtains or an eye mask to create the ideal environment.

Exercise

Exercise is a simple and effective contributor to helping individuals fall asleep faster. Specifically, exercises that involve cardiovascular components have a greater impact on sleep because of its ability to decrease the time it takes individuals to fall asleep initially. Regular exercise can also improve sleep quality through its production of melatonin which helps to regulate sleep cycles. Although exercise can improve sleep quality in many aspects, it does have the potential to also suppress melatonin which is why it is recommended that individuals do not exercise too close to their bedtime. A study was conducted with student athletes (who actively engage in physical activity) and non-athletes (who do not engage in physical activity) attending Polish universities to compare and understand physical activity or exercise's impact on sleep quality. According to table 1 of the results section, the study observed that student athletes had a score below 5 in the PSQI (Pittsburg Sleep Quality Index) whereas non-athlete students had a score above 5. In this study, the PSQI measures "good sleepers" as individuals with a score below 5 and "bad sleepers" with a score above 5, demonstrating that students who incorporate the aspect of physical activity statistically experience better sleep quality
