= Radio Equipment Directive (2014) =

Directive of the European Union

The Radio Equipment Directive (RED, EU directive 2014/53/EU) established a regulatory framework for placing radio equipment on the market in the EU. All radio equipment within the scope of this directive that are placed on the EU market must have been compliant with the directive from 13 June 2017. The delay of the publication and approval of the details of this directive has led to difficulties for companies attempting to comply with the directive.

== Directive ==
This directive was published on 16 April 2014. It replaced the previous directive R&TTE 1999/5/EC as of 13 June 2016. Equipment must be compliant with the new directive in order to be authorized to be placed on the market from 12 June 2017 and onward.

As approved by the European Commission, the directive contains legal definitions for the essential requirements of the classes and categories of equipment to which it applies. A list of specific requirements in the directive is contained within Article 3, Paragraph 3 of the directive.

== Harmonized standards ==
A harmonised standard is a European standard developed by a recognised European Standards Organisation: CEN, CENELEC, or ETSI. The directive outlines the requirements that must be met in order for Radio Equipment to meet the harmonized standard for these industry items.

The list of harmonized standards is regularly published on the official journal of the European Union. Each harmonized standard covers one or more essential requirements. More than one harmonized standard may in some cases be needed to meet all of the essential requirements of RED.

The responsibility for the creation of the harmonized standards for products in this directive falls with ETSI and Cenelec.

For example, a piece of Wi-Fi equipment will refer to the following harmonized standards:

- IEC 62368-1 (Essential requirement of article 3, paragraph 1, point a of the directive: safety – electrical safety)
- EN 50371 (Essential requirement of article 3, paragraph 1, point a of the directive: safety – human exposure to electromagnetic fields)
- EN 301 489-17 (Essential requirement of article 3, paragraph 1, point b of the directive: electromagnetic compatibility)
- EN 300 328 (Essential requirement of article 3, paragraph 2 of the directive: efficient use of the radio spectrum)

== RED Cyber ==
As part of its broader safety and spectrum requirements, RED has been extended to include explicit cybersecurity obligations for internet-connected radio devices. These provisions were introduced under Delegated Regulation (EU) 2022/30, effective 1 August 2024.

=== Legal basis ===
The amended Articles 3(3)(d), (e), (f) require that:

- (d) radio equipment must not harm networks or misuse network resources;
- (e) devices, especially internet-connected devices, wearables and toys, must protect personal data and privacy;
- (f) radio equipment used for monetary transactions must include anti-fraud safeguards.

=== Harmonised standard EN 18031 ===
The EN 18031 series was published in the Official Journal of the European Union on 30 January 2025, and will be applicable as of 1 August 2025.

It comprises:

- EN 18031-1: network protection (Article 3(3)(d));
- EN 18031-2: personal data and privacy protection (Article 3(3)(e));
- EN 18031-3: fraud protection (Article 3(3)(f)).

According to guidance from various notified bodies, the application of the harmonised standard grants presumption of conformity. However, certain restrictions apply regarding password enforcement, parental controls, and update mechanisms; if unmet, an assessment by a notified body is required.

=== Timeline ===
Date	Event
12 January 2022	Publication of Delegated Regulation (EU) 2022/30
1 August 2024	Entry into force of RED cybersecurity obligations
30 January 2025	EN 18031 published in the Official Journal of the European Union
1 August 2025	Harmonised standards become fully applicable

== Reception ==
Businesses are facing difficulties when complying with this new directive. The list of harmonized standards has not yet been fully completed. Harmonized standards for Wi-Fi 5 GHz routers, for FM receivers and for EMC and safety radio equipment have not been completed yet.

Researchers at the TU Darmstadt claim that German legislation disallows operation of flashed devices, even if they were created prior to the introduction of this new directive.

The European Commission has been asked to reach a practical solution to this issue. Nevertheless, industry associations have highlighted that it will be impossible for equipment to comply with new standards immediately, especially when new technical requirements may lead to design modification for certain products.

The Free Software Foundation Europe (FSFE) dubbed the new directive the "Radio Lockdown Directive". The FSFE has claimed that the directive will make it harder for small businesses to develop routers, since they will be tivoised and therefore GPLv3 incompatible. The FSFE has also stated that the tivoisation will disable the Freifunk project.

It was revised by Radio Equipment Directive 2021/0291, which requires new smartphones to use USB-C as a universal charger by the end of 2024, and laptops by 2026.
