= Universal charger =

Battery charger standardization project

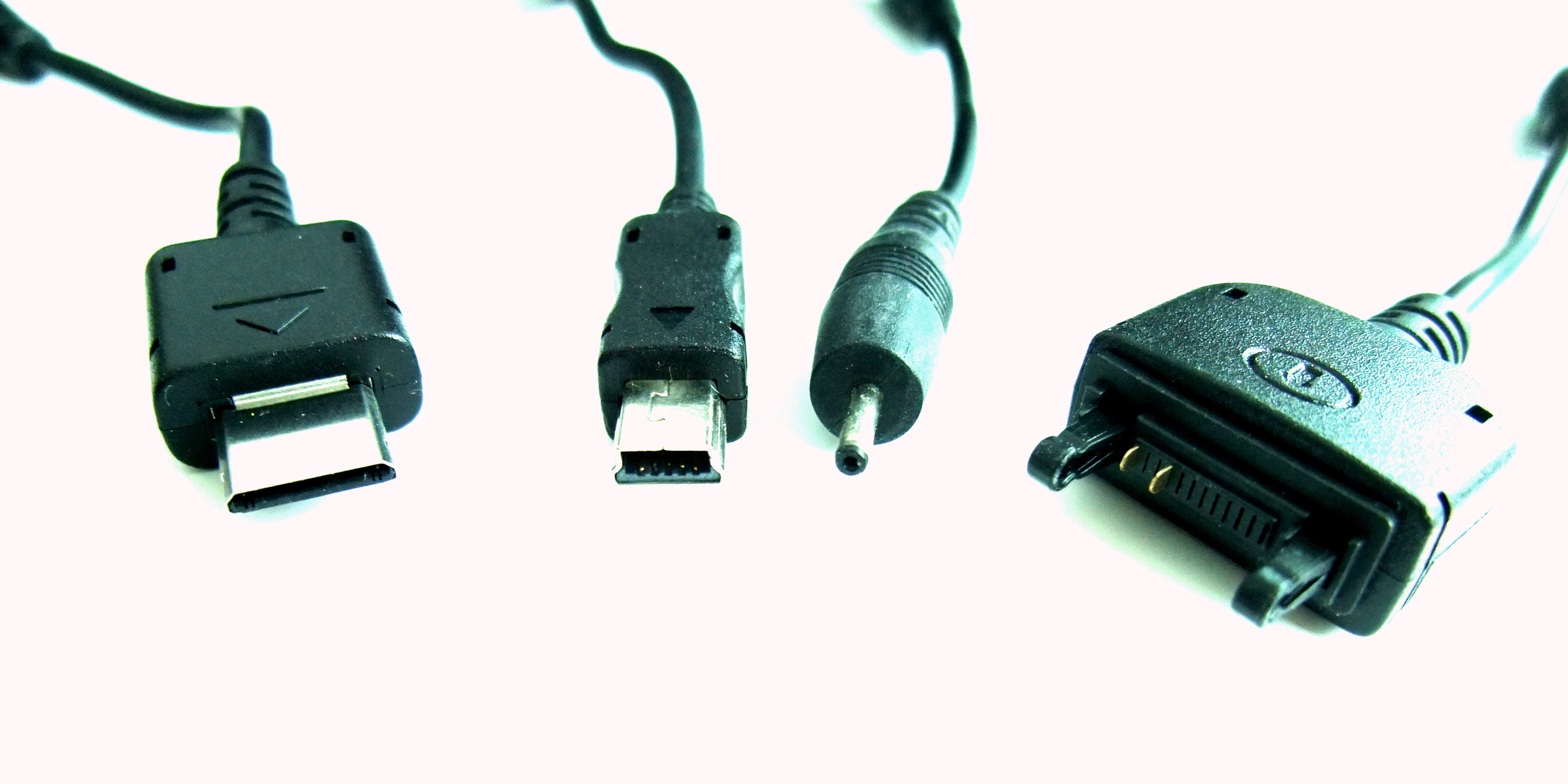
Mobile phone charger plugs. From left to right: Samsung proprietary charging plug, USB Mini-B plug, Nokia charger plug used on the E71, Nokia Pop-Port

A universal charger, or common charger, is a charger complying with any of various projects to standardize power supplies and connectors, particularly for battery-powered devices.

Since the publication of the USB Power Delivery standard in 2012, and the USB-C connector in 2014, USB-C has become a widespread standard for charging mobile phones.

== Advantages and disadvantages ==
A situation where a variety of connectors proliferate has several disadvantages. It is inconvenient and costly for users, and causes unnecessary electronic waste when users change devices, due to the disposal of chargers still in working order.

Legislation for mandatory charger standards has been criticized, particularly by Apple, who argued in 2019 that a single standard would "freeze innovation rather than encourage it." Apple also noted that if a universal standard was not an existing standard, adoption of a new standard would lead to increased e-waste. Apple used their proprietary Lightning connector, from which USB‑C is derived, for many devices, but has used only USB-C in new products since 2023.

== Examples ==
=== European Union ===
In 2009, the European Union proposed the common external power supply, a voluntary specification from 2009 to 2014, which used the micro USB connector.

In 2022, the EU passed Radio Equipment Directive 2022/2380, a law which requires all new smartphones to use USB-C charging by the end of 2024, and all laptops by spring 2026.

=== South Korea ===
In March 2001, the Korean Telecommunications Technology Association (TTA) released a "Standard on I/O Connection Interface of Digital Cellular Phone". This standard describes the electromechanical interface specifications for cellular phone charging, wired data communication, analog audio, etc. and was released together with related test and certification specifications. The main feature of the standard is the specification of a 24-pin connector/socket for mobile phones to handle connections for power input (battery charging) and output, data communication (USB and other digital signals), analog audio inputs and outputs (for hands-free microphone, earphone) and other signals. The 2007 revision of the standard specified a smaller 20-pin connector to succeed the 24-pin connector and added analog (composite) video output support, among other changes. Chargers with the new 20-pin connectors started appearing in 2008 and phone manufacturers were urged to include 24-to-20-pin adapters with new phones sold in Korea to enable the charging of new phones with the older 24-pin chargers.

=== China ===
In December 2006, the Chinese Ministry of Industry and Information Technology (MII) released a new China Communications Standards Association (CCSA) standard, "Technical Requirements and Test Method of Charger and Interface for Mobile Telecommunication Terminal Equipment". This standard describes the electromechanical requirements for a common mobile device battery charger equipped with a USB type-A socket providing power at 5 V DC. All new mobile phones requesting network access approval in China from June 2007 are required to support charging from the new common chargers. The original 2006 regulation is flexible regarding the interface on the mobile phone itself, allowing for the use of adapter cables if the mobile device is not equipped with a standard USB connector. Among other things, the 2009 update adds references to USB On-The-Go (OTG) support and the use of USB micro-B, micro-AB, mini-B; and Mini-10-pin and cylindrical ("barrel") type connectors on the terminal (phone) for charging.

=== GSMA universal charging solution (UCS) and OMTP common charging solution (CCS) ===
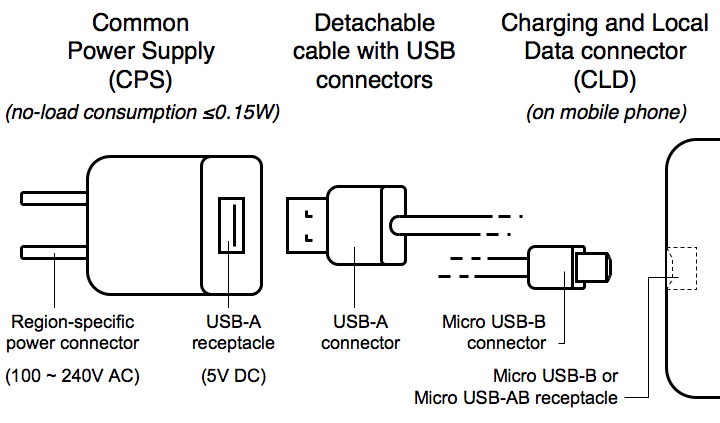
OMTP's common charging solution (CCS) components

In February 2009, the GSM Association (GSMA), together with six mobile phone manufacturers and technology providers, and eleven mobile service providers, announced their commitment to implementing a cross-industry standard for a common/universal charging solution for new mobile phones and chargers. The aim of the GSMA initiative was "...to ensure that the mobile industry adopts a common format for mobile phone charger connections and energy-efficient charger...". Universal charging solution (UCS) chargers were required to use micro-USB as the common universal charging interface and have a four-star or higher efficiency rating (standby energy use ≤ 0.15 W).

The Open Mobile Terminal Platform industry forum (OMTP) specified the requirements of the GSMA's Universal Charging Solution and published these requirements under the title "Common Charging and Local Data Connectivity" in 2009. This document specified the three components of a common charging solution (CCS): a charging and local data connector (CLD) on the "terminal" (e.g., a mobile phone) consisting of a micro USB-B (2.0) or micro USB-AB (2.0) receptacle; a common power supply (CPS) with a USB type-A receptacle; and a detachable USB type-A to micro USB-B (2.0) cable to connect the power supply with the mobile phone. As of early 2011, an additional 10 service providers and one additional mobile phone manufacturer had joined the agreement.

In April 2009, the industry trade group The Wireless Association (CTIA) announced its support of the GSMA's Universal Charging Solution.

=== ITU Universal power adapter and charger solution ===
The International Telecommunication Union (ITU, the UN specialized agency in the field of telecommunications, information and communication technologies) announced in October 2009 that it had also embraced the universal charging solution standard—based on input from the GSMA—as its "energy-efficient one-charger-fits-all new mobile phone solution." The ITU published Recommendation ITU-T L.1000, specifying a charger similar in most respects to that of the GSMA/OMTP proposal and of the Chinese charger and the EU's common EPS. The ITU specifies that the OMTP's more aggressive "preferred" no load consumption requirement be mandatory after a three-year "transition period" but is more flexible in allowing the use of captive cables and USB micro-B adapters in its "target solution" – similar to the European common EPS standard. The ITU recommendation was expanded and updated in June 2011.

=== USB Power Delivery and Type-C specification ===
In 2012, the USB Power Delivery (PD) specification was released. Power Delivery provides the ability for 5 V devices to draw more than 7.5 W of power (the limit specified by USB Battery Charging) from USB PD-aware ports when using PD-aware USB cables. The specification also allows PD ports to provide even greater power at higher voltages over PD-aware cables; up to 36 W at 12 V and 60 W at 20 V (for micro-USB connectors) and up to 60 W at 12 V and 100 W at 20 V (for type-A/B connectors).

In August 2014, the USB 3.0 Promoter Group announced the completion of the USB Type-C connector and cable specification. Type-C cables and connectors are reversible and are electrically backward compatible, but not physically backward compatible, with previous USB plugs and receptacles. New-to-existing cables and adapters have been defined. Some USB Type-C cables and connectors can support "USB performance at SuperSpeed USB 10 Gbps (USB 3.1) and USB Power Delivery up to 100W" although USB Type-C cables are only required to support USB 2.0 (non-SuperSpeed) data rates and 3 A (60 W at 20 V) of current. Such minimum-specification USB Type-C cables are sometimes referred to as "charge" cables because, for most mobile device battery charging applications, 60 W is more than sufficient and a higher data transfer speed is less important than minimizing cable cost and maximizing cable length.

=== IEC Technical Specification 62700: DC Power supply for notebook computer ===
IEC 62700 is a specification published in 2014 with the aim of creating a universal laptop charger.

=== IEEE P1823, universal power adapter for mobile devices (UPAMD) ===
IEEE P1823 was a proposed global standard for a universal power adapter for mobile devices (UPAMD) that require between 10 W and 240 W. E.g., Laptops, larger tablets and other mobile devices that can require much more power than the (non-Power Delivery) USB battery charging specification limit of 7.5 W at 5 V.

The specification was published in 2015, but was not widely adopted. In 2019 the chair of the IEEE 1823 working group wrote, "Currently the IT market which 1823 standard was originally intended had been swayed by USB SIG to use type C connector as alternatives."

== See also ==
- DC connector
- Coaxial power connector
