= Common external power supply =

Smartphone charger specification

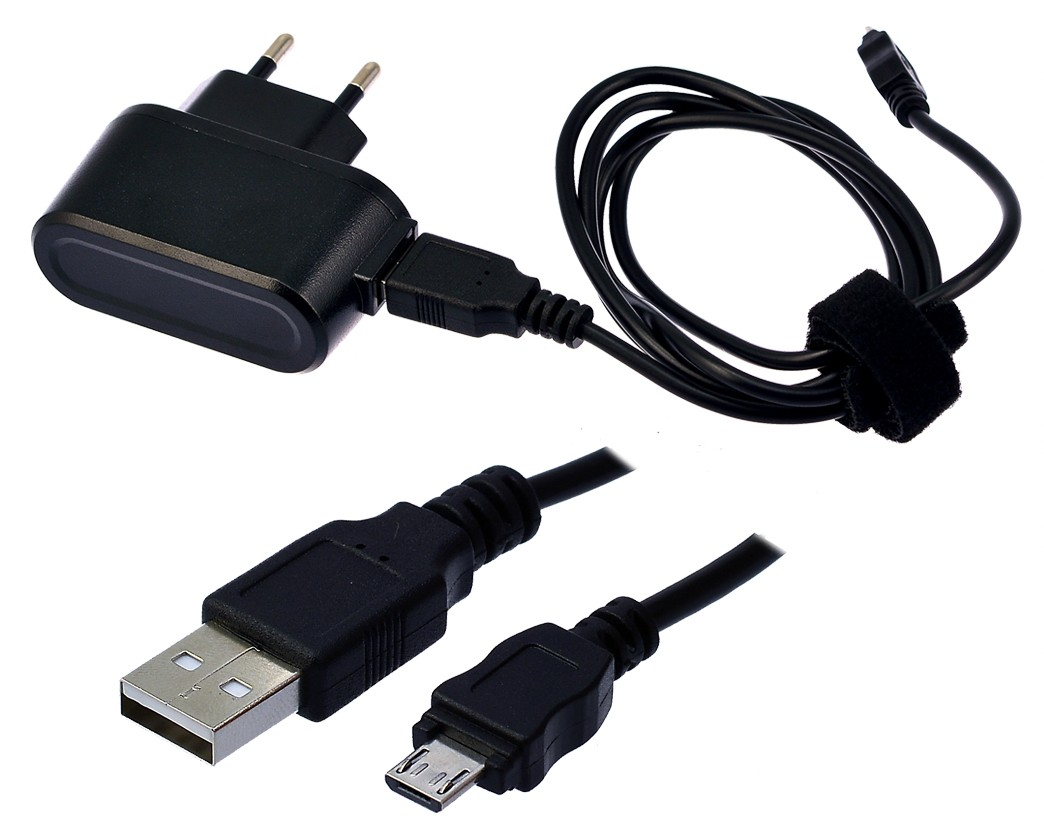
Common external power supply and the USB Standard-A and Micro-B ends of the detachable cable

The common external power supply (Common EPS) was a European Commission (EC) specification for a universal charger for smartphones sold within the European Union. The specification included the use of a USB Micro-B connector and adherence to the USB Battery Charging Specification.

The purpose of the specification was to reduce waste and increase convenience for consumers. Common EPS started as an EC-sponsored agreement between manufacturers, and was formalised into a technical standard by relevant EU standardisation bodies. The specification EN/IEC 62684 was active from 2009 to 2014.

Although compliance was voluntary, a majority of the world's largest mobile phone manufacturers agreed to make their applicable mobile phones compatible. Apple, one of the major signatories, was still found to be in compliance despite using proprietary connectors for the iPhone, since the specification allowed for the use of adaptors.

To replace the obsolete specification, the European Union later passed the Radio Equipment Directive (2022), which requires new smartphones to use USB-C by the end of 2024, and laptops by 2026.

== Purpose ==
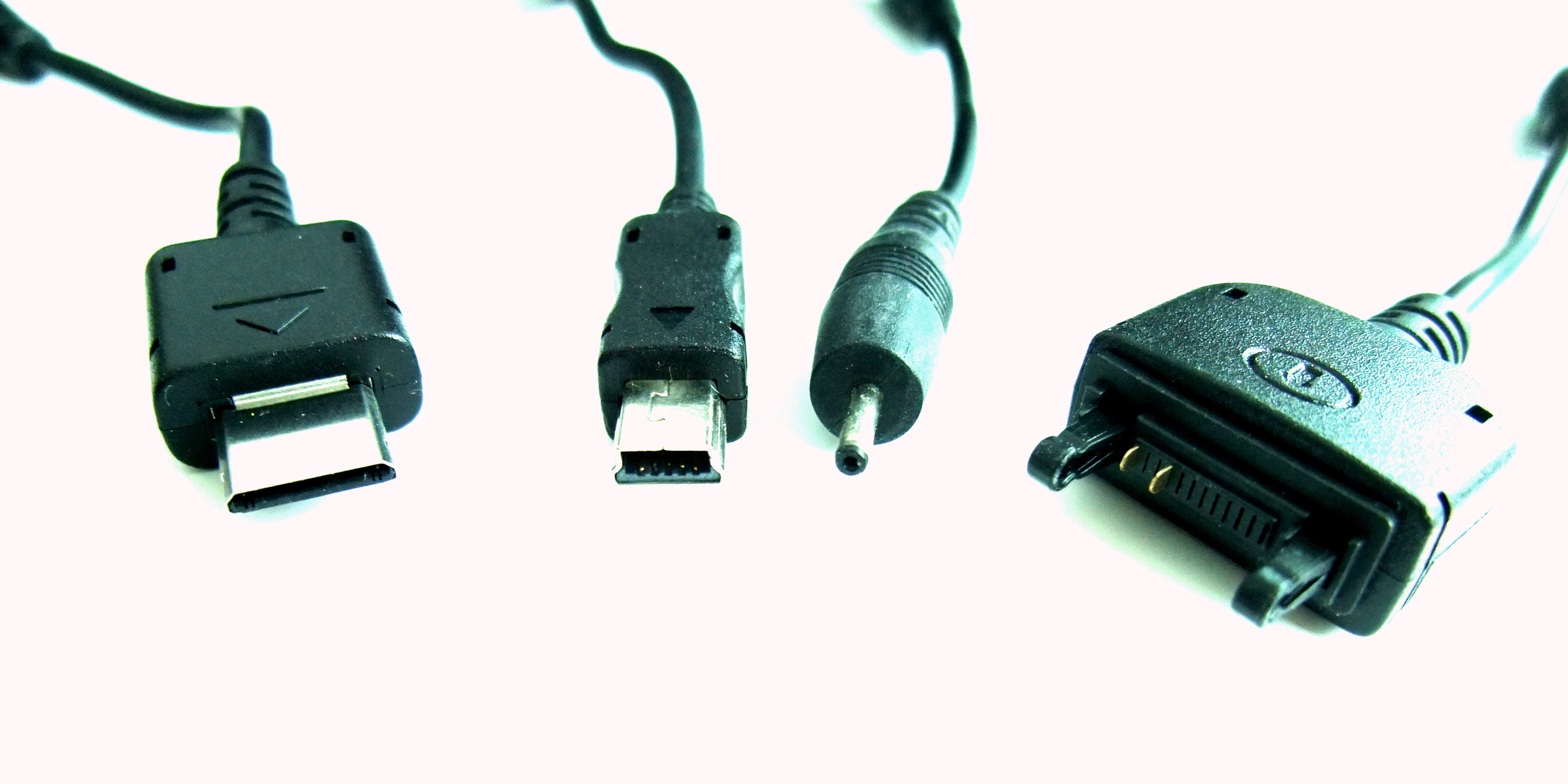
Examples of different charger connectors previously used by manufacturers (Samsung, Motorola, Nokia, Sony Ericsson)

According to the European Commission, a common external power supply / "charger" standard is desirable because,

Incompatibility of chargers for mobile phones is a major environmental problem and an inconvenience for users across the EU. Currently specific chargers are sold together with specific mobile phones. A user who wants to change his/her mobile phone must usually acquire a new charger and dispose the current one, even if this is in perfect condition. This unnecessarily generates important amounts of electronic waste... Harmonising mobile phone chargers will bring significant economic and environmental benefits... Consumers will not need to buy a new charger together with every mobile phone...

— European Commission – FAQ

== History ==
In June 2009, many of the world's largest mobile phone manufacturers signed an EC-sponsored memorandum of understanding (MoU), agreeing to make most new data-enabled mobile phones marketed in the European Union compatible with a to-be-specified common EPS. All signatories agreed to develop a common specification for the EPS "to allow for full compatibility and safety of chargers and mobile phones." 14 mobile phone manufacturers and technology providers signed the MoU – the original 10 signatories, Apple, LG, Motorola, NEC, Nokia, Qualcomm, RIM, Samsung, Sony Ericsson, and Texas Instruments as well as Atmel, Emblaze Mobile, Huawei Technologies and TCT Mobile (Alcatel).

To develop and formalize the needed technical standards, the Commission issued a standardisation mandate to CEN, CENELEC and ETSI on a common "charging capability for mobile telephones." In response, CENELEC created a task force to develop the interoperability specifications of a common external power supply. In line with the Dresden agreement signed in 1996 by both CENELEC and the International Electrotechnical Commission (IEC), work was transferred into the IEC.

The standard was published by CENELEC in December 2010 as EN 62684:2010 "Interoperability specifications of common EPS for use with data-enabled mobile telephones" and by the IEC in January 2011 as IEC 62684:2011 (international publication was slightly delayed due to French translation) with a technical update to the IEC standard in 2018.

The original Common EPS memorandum of understanding expired at the end of 2012. The Commission reported at the time that all of the fourteen MoU signatories, "have met their obligations under the MoU." Eight of the original MoU signatories signed a 2013 Letter of Intent (LoI) to extend the 2009 MoU another year and, in 2014, five of those companies (Apple, Blackberry, Huawei, Samsung and Sony) again signed a second Letter of Intent, effectively extending the MoU through the end of 2014.

== Technical specifications ==
=== Reference to USB battery-charging specification ===
The common EPS specification relies heavily on existing USB electro-mechanical standards – especially the USB Battery Charging Specification. By the mid-2000s, many mobile phone manufacturers (as well as manufacturers of other small battery-powered devices) had already begun designing their products with the ability to use a USB port's 5 V DC power to recharge batteries. The USB Implementers Forum, recognizing this trend, updated the USB standard in 2007 to better accommodate this popular battery-charging application of USB ports, primarily by defining "charging ports" which can provide more current allowing faster re-charging of batteries. In November 2010, the IEC signed an agreement with the USB Implementers Forum, which led to the IEC incorporating USB specifications into the IEC 62684:2011 International Standard.

In March 2011, the USB Implementers Forum agreed to allow CENELEC "... to make reference to USB technology in its European Standard EN 62684:2010 and ... to grant download access to USB technical specifications free of charge and at any time to manufacturers implementing this European [common EPS] Standard."

=== Cabling, connectors and adapters ===
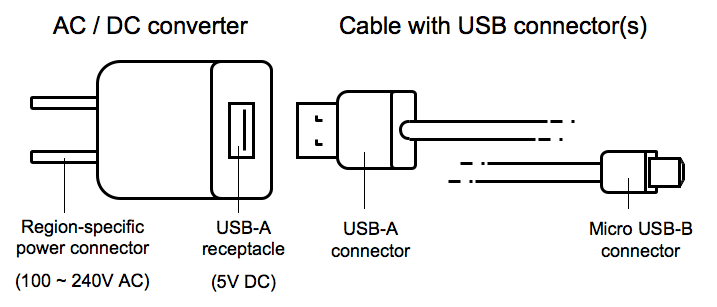
EU common external power supply components

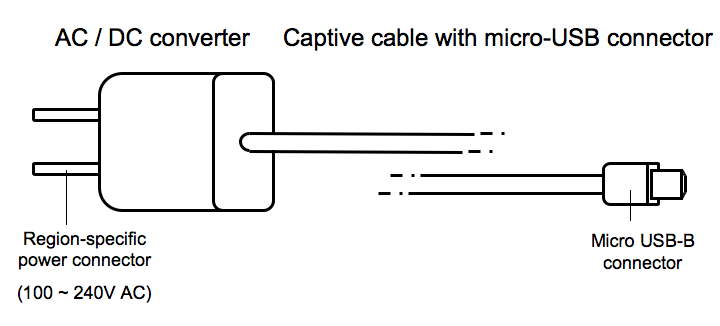
EU common external power supply with captive cable

A common EPS must include a cable with a micro USB-B (2.0) connector for connecting to a mobile phone. This cable can be either captive (permanently attached to the power supply) or detachable. If detachable, the cable must connect to the power supply via a standard USB type-A plug.

The MoU which defines the common external power supply as well as the related EC standardisation mandate both allow for the use of the common external power supply also with phones not equipped with a micro-USB receptacle. "... [MoU] 4.2.1 ... if a manufacturer makes available an Adaptor from the Micro-USB connector of a Common EPS to a specific non-Micro-USB socket in the Mobile Phone, it shall constitute compliance to this article" and, "... An Adaptor can also be a detachable cable."

The type of AC "plug" provided on a common EPS can vary depending on the intended market of use. "Per regulatory requirements for each market. ... preferred supplied input voltage range should be at least 90–264 V" (100–240 V ± 10%).

== Reception ==
The common EPS initiative was generally well received by the public, although at least one European consumer group bemoaned the voluntary nature and narrow scope of the initiative (as it applies only to mobile phones and only those that are "handheld" and "data-enabled") and the fact that the EU's EPS specification does not set aggressive energy efficiency no-load consumption requirements.

Some observers, noting Apple's continued use of proprietary, non-micro USB charging ports on their smartphones, suggested Apple was not in compliance with the 2009 Common EPS Memorandum of Understanding. The European Commission however, confirmed that all MoU signatories, "have met their obligations under the MoU," stating specifically, "Concerning Apple's previous and present proprietary connectors and their compatibility with the agreement, the MoU allows for the use of an adaptor without prescribing the conditions for its provision" and "The Commission does not have evidence that Apple has breached the [MoU] agreement. The iPhone 5 can be used with an adaptor allowing it to be connected to the common charger."

== Later European legislation ==
In a 2013 amendment to a "Proposal for a Directive of the European Parliament … relating to the making available on the market of radio equipment", the European Committee on the Internal Market and Consumer Protection included a recommendation for "... A renewed effort to develop a common charger ... [being] highly desirable and consequently ... beneficial in particular for consumers and other end-users." The parliamentary proposal applies to all radio equipment (any "product which intentionally emits or receives radio waves for communication") including mobile phones, tablet computers, car door openers, modems, etc. Yet, the draft law (Directive 2014/53/EU), approved overwhelmingly by the European Parliament on 13 March 2014, stipulates that it will be up to the European Commission to decide which specific types of radio equipment will have to be compatible with common chargers. Once formally approved by the Council of Ministers, member states will have two years to transpose the new regulations into national laws and manufacturers will have an additional year after that to comply.

In January 2020, the European Parliament passed a resolution, calling upon the European Commission to adopt rules on the mandatory introduction of common chargers for all mobile devices. Specifically the resolution calls upon the European Commission to, "...take action to introduce the common charger by adopting the delegated act supplementing Directive 2014/53/EU on radio equipment defining a standard for a common charger for mobile phones and other small and medium-sized radio equipment by July 2020, or, if necessary, by adopting a legislative measure by July 2020 at the latest;..."

In light of the declining popularity of the Micro USB connector and its limited power throughput relative to USB-C, in September 2021, the European Commission adopted a proposal to for a new directive, to update the existing Directive 2014/53/EU. The directive was approved by the European Parliament and Council of the European Union. The resulting directive, Radio Equipment Directive 2021/0291 requires all hand-held items sold from 2024 onward to have and be able to charge via a USB Type-C port. Manufacturers would also be required to offer consumers the option of purchasing their devices without any charging device.

== Similar regional and global industry initiatives for mobile phone charging ==
Other mobile phone power supply and charging standards have been implemented in other parts of the world (e.g., Korea and China). Proposals for a global/industry-wide mobile phone charging solution have also been promoted by the International Telecommunication Union (ITU) and by industry organizations GSMA and OMTP. The ITU and the GSMA/OMTP proposals are very similar to the European Common EPS and Chinese charger standards although the GSMA/OMTP proposal is less flexible and has not been adopted by as many phone manufacturers as has the EU standard.

== See also ==
- Universal charger
- Radio Equipment Directive 2021/0291
