= Radio Equipment Directive (2022) =

European Union directive mandating a universal charging standard

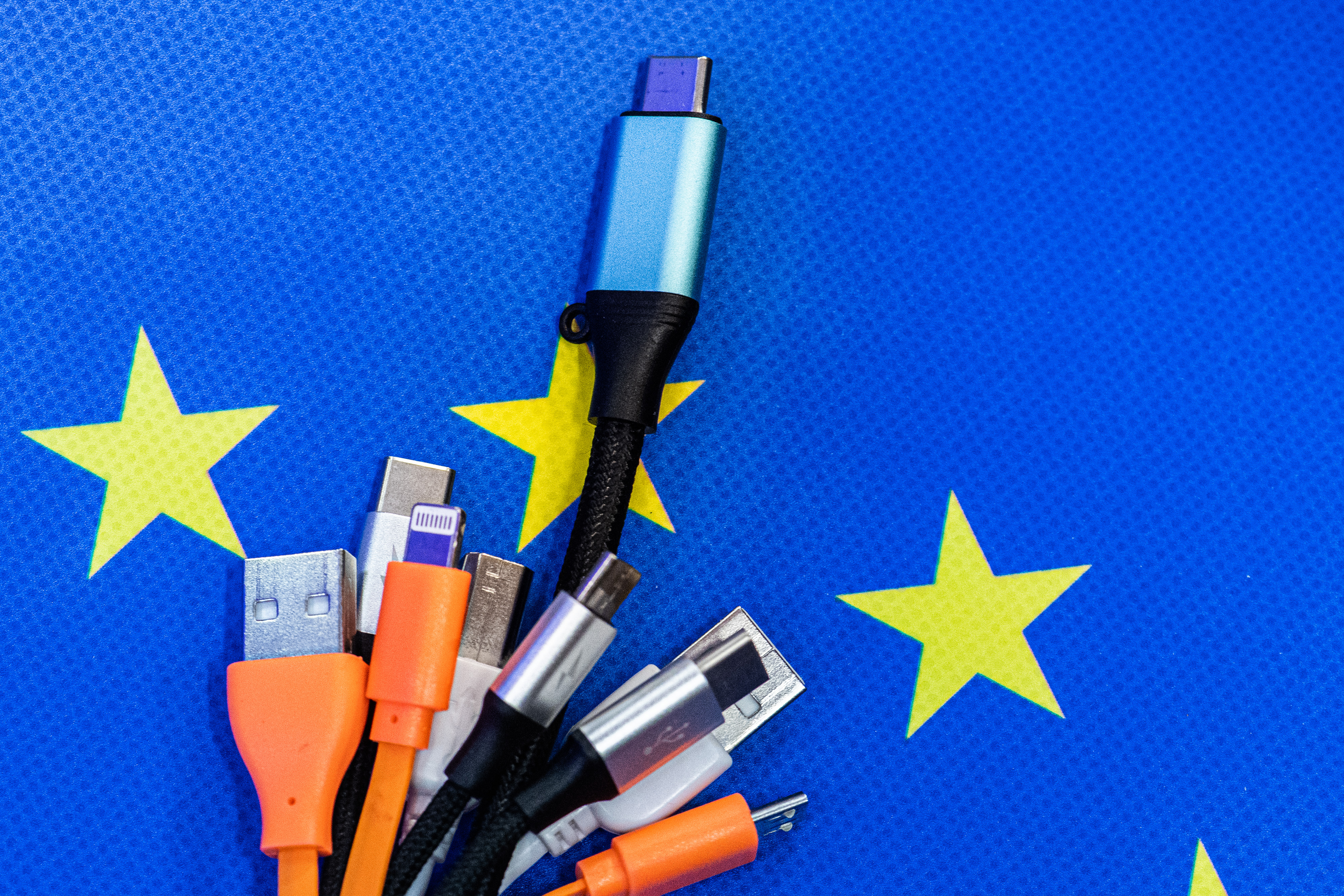
European Parliament adopted new rules to make USB type-C the common charging standard for small electronic devices by the end of 2024.

Directive (EU) 2022/2380 is a directive of the European Parliament and the European Council which was formally adopted on 23 November 2022 amending Radio Equipment Directive 2014/53. The directive mandates the use of USB-C as a universal charger using a standard USB-C cable for smartphones, tablets, digital cameras, headphones, headsets, handheld video game consoles, portable speakers, e-readers, keyboards, mice, portable navigation systems, and earbuds that use wired charging by the end of 2024, and laptops by 2026.

== Directive ==
The purpose of the directive is to reduce electronic waste by reducing the need for consumers to purchase different chargers for their equipment. The directive also allows the unbundling of a charger with a device when sold.

Countries with mandatory application of USB-C power ports – for most 5-20v (max 100w) consumer devices – by law

If such equipment is capable of being recharged by wired charging at voltages higher than 5 volts, currents higher than 3 amperes, or powers higher than 15 watts, the equipment must support the full functionality of USB Power Delivery.

It is considered a successor to the EU's common external power supply (2009–2014), a voluntary specification which used micro-USB as a standard connector.

The legislation was criticised by Apple, who argued in 2019 that a single standard would "freeze innovation rather than encourage it." Apple also noted that if a universal standard was not an existing standard, adoption of a new standard would lead to increased e-waste. Apple Inc. used its proprietary Lightning connector for a few products in their portfolio, including the iPhone, when the legislation was introduced, but officially ended their production of the Lightning connector in 2025 after all their devices adopted charging cables with USB-C in compliance with the legislation.

== See also ==
- Brussels effect
