= USB hardware =

Communication connector using the USB protocol

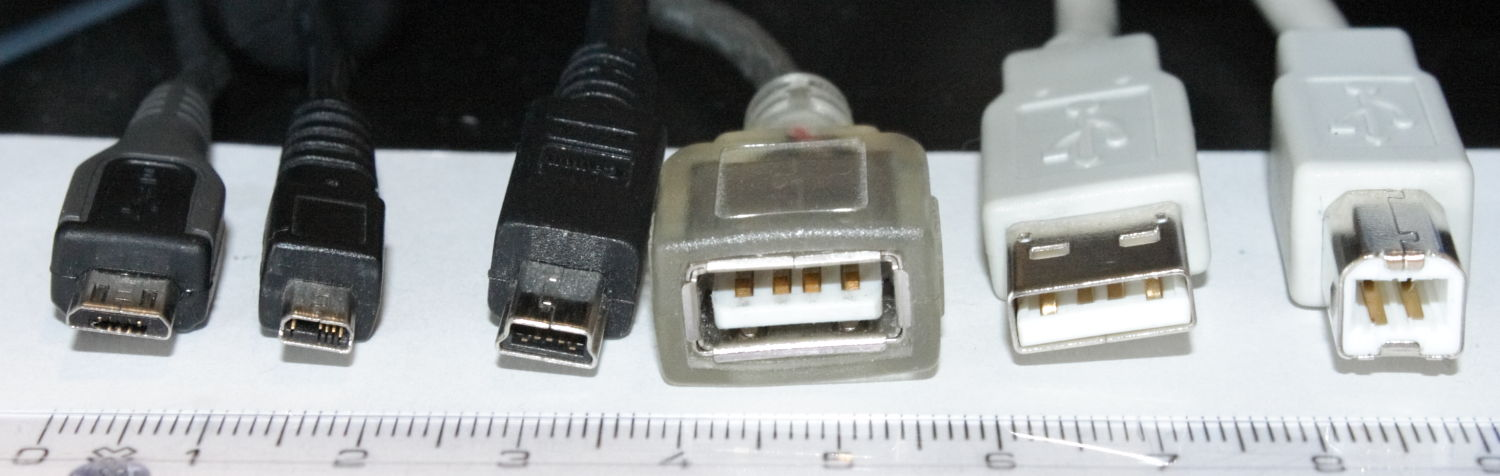
Various legacy USB connectors along a centimeter ruler for scale. From left to right: 1. Micro-B plug; 2. Proprietary UC-E6 connector used on many older Japanese cameras for both USB and analog AV output; 3. Mini-B plug (inverted); 4. Standard-A receptacle (inverted; non-compliant because official USB specifications do not allow for extension cables); 5. Standard-A plug; 6. Standard-B plug

The initial versions of the USB standard specified connectors that were easy to use and would have long life spans; revisions of the standard added smaller connectors useful for compact portable devices. Higher-speed development of the USB standard gave rise to another family of connectors to permit additional data links. All versions of USB specify cable properties. Version 3.x cables, marketed as SuperSpeed, added a data link; namely, in 2008, USB 3.0 added a full-duplex lane (two twisted pairs of wires for one differential signal of serial data per direction), and in 2014, the USB-C specification added a second full-duplex lane.

USB has always included some capability of providing power to peripheral devices, but the amount of power that can be given has increased over time. The modern specifications are called USB Power Delivery (USB PD) and allow up to 240 watts. Initially USB 1.0/2.0 provided up to 2.5 W, USB 3.0 provided up to 4.5 W, and subsequent Battery Charging (BC) specifications provided power up to 7.5 W. The modern Power Delivery specifications began with USB PD 1.0 in 2012, providing for power delivery up to 60 watts; PD 2.0 version 1.2 in 2013, along with USB 3.1, up to 100 W; and USB PD 3.1 in 2021 raised the maximum to 240 W. USB has been selected as the charging format for many mobile phones and other peripheral devices and hubs, reducing the proliferation of proprietary chargers. Since USB 3.1, Power Delivery is part of the USB standard.

A standard USB-C cable can carry at least 60 watts and at least of USB 2.0 (480 Mbit/s half-duplex).

In 2019, USB4, which uses only the USB-C connector, added connection-oriented video and audio abilities (DisplayPort) and compatibility with Thunderbolt 3 and later.

== Connectors ==
Plugs and receptacles

Comparison of plugs (Type‑C and eleven legacy ones it replaces; to scale)

Comparison of receptacles (Type‑C and twelve legacy ones it replaces; to scale)

USB implements a tiered star-like network topology. Unlike other data buses (such as Ethernet), USB connections are directional. Ports are classified as either downstream-facing ports (DFPs) or upstream-facing ports (UFPs), though there are also those that can be dual-role. Ports on the host, and those on a hub to which peripheral devices are connected, are DFPs, while the port on each peripheral device and the port on a hub used to connect it to a host (or an upstream hub), are UFPs. Only downstream-facing ports originally provided power by default. This topology was chosen to easily prevent electrical overload and damage to equipment.

Prior to the introduction of Type-C, USB receptacles and their plugs had physically distinct shapes for different roles (DFP, UFP, and dual-role), preventing the possibility of two hosts, or two peripheral devices, erroneously being connected together. DFP receptacles and their corresponding plugs were known as Type-A; UFP receptacles and their corresponding plugs were known as Type-B; while those that were dual role were known as Type-AB. Consequently, a standards-conforming USB cable with such legacy plugs on both ends would have had a Type-A plug on one end, and a Type-B plug on the other. USB extension cables with a Type-A plug on one end and a Type-A port on the other existed but these were not compliant with USB standards. A Type-AB receptacle accepted both Type-A and Type-B plugs, and a device with such a receptacle took either the host or the peripheral device role according to the type of plug attached.

With the introduction of Type‑C came transitional cables, called legacy cable assemblies in the standard, each with a Type‑C plug at one end and a Type-A or a Type-B plug at the other. These transitional cables are still directional, and in such a cable the Type‑C plug is electrically marked as either A or B as appropriate to complement the opposite connector. The modern standard is a cable with a Type-C plug on each end; these cables are non-directional, and connected devices instead negotiate their respective roles.

Legacy plugs and receptacles (types A, B and AB) came in three different sizes: The original Standard size; Mini, which was the first attempt to accommodate handheld mobile equipment (now mostly deprecated); and Micro. All of these were superseded in 2014 by Type‑C, which is required for operational modes with two lanes (USB 3.2 1×2 (10 Gbit/s), USB 3.2 2×2 (20 Gbit/s), or any USB4 modes) and allows power up to 240 watts in either direction.

Before USB4, there were five speeds for USB data transfer: USB 1 (both 1.0 and 1.1) had Low-Speed (1.5 Mbit/s half duplex) and Full-Speed (12 Mbit/s half duplex); USB 2 added High-Speed (480 Mbit/s half duplex); USB 3.0 added SuperSpeed (5 Gbit/s full duplex, later designated USB 3.2 Gen 1×1); and USB 3.1 added SuperSpeed+ (10 Gbit/s full duplex, designated USB 3.1 Gen 2, later USB 3.2 Gen 2×1).

Legacy connectors have differing hardware and cabling requirements for the first three generations of the standard (USB 1.x, USB 2.0, and USB 3.x). USB devices have some choice of implemented modes, and since USB 3.1 the USB revision alone does not sufficiently designate implemented modes. Which capabilities a device supports are defined by the device's chipset or included SoC and the OS's supported drivers (therefore one must check the full names of the supported USB operation modes in the device's specification; the printed icons usually do not specify all modes, or precisely enough). In the USB 3 specifications it is recommended that the insulators visible inside Standard‑A SuperSpeed plugs and receptacles be a specific blue color (Pantone 300 C). In Standard‑A receptacles with support for the 10 Gbit/s (Gen 2) signaling rate introduced in USB 3.1, some makers instead use a teal blue color, but the standards recommend the same blue for all SuperSpeed-capable Standard‑A receptacles, including those capable of the higher rate.

=== Properties ===
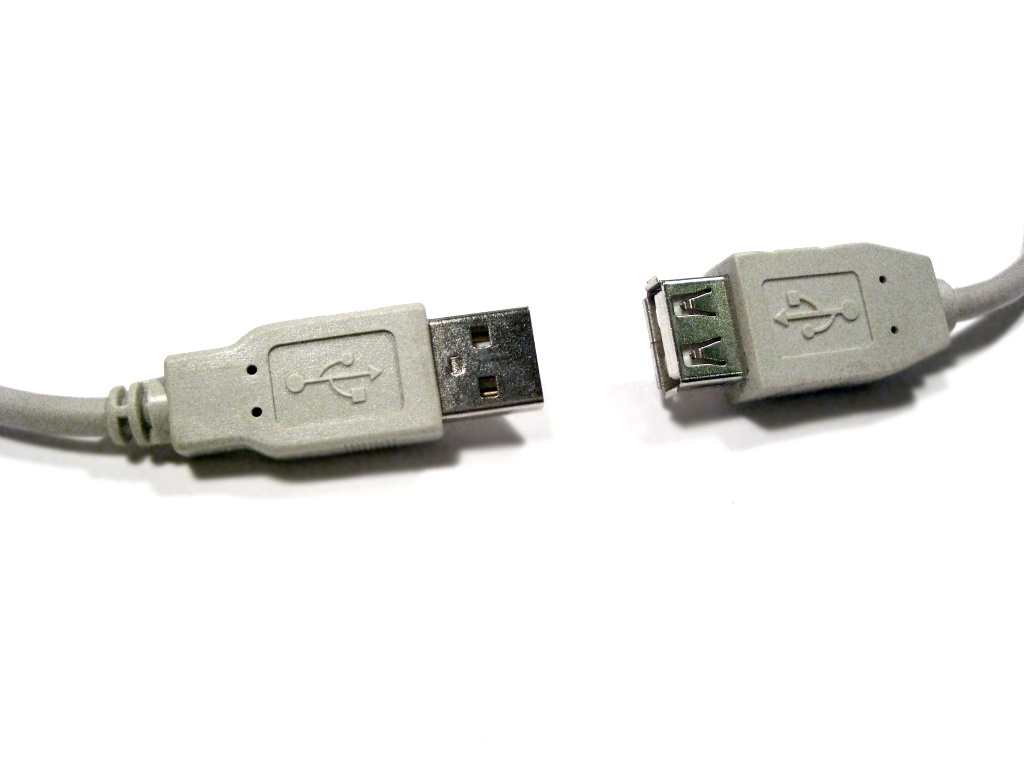
Prohibited USB extension cable, plug on the left, receptacle on the right. (USB does not allow extension cables. Non-standard cables may work but cannot be presumed reliable.)

The connectors the USB committee specifies support a number of USB's underlying goals, and reflect lessons learned from the many connectors the computer industry has used. The connector mounted on the host or device is called the receptacle, and the connector attached to the cable is called the plug.

By design, it is difficult to insert a USB plug into its receptacle incorrectly. The USB specification requires that the cable plug and receptacle be marked so the user can recognize the proper orientation. The USB‑C plug, however, is reversible. USB cables and small USB devices are held in place by the gripping force from the receptacle, with no screws, clips, or thumb-turns as other connectors use.

The different A and B plugs prevent accidentally connecting two power sources. However, some of this directed topology is lost with the advent of multi-purpose USB connections (such as USB On-The-Go in smartphones, and USB-powered Wi-Fi routers), which require A-to-A, B-to-B, and sometimes Y/splitter cables. See the USB On-The-Go connectors section below for a more detailed summary description.

There are so-called cables with A plugs on both ends, which may be valid if the "cable" includes, for example, a USB host-to-host transfer device with two ports. This is, by definition, a device with two logical B ports, each with a captive cable, not a cable with two A ends.

==== Durability ====
The standard connectors were designed to be more robust than many past connectors. This is because USB is hot-swappable, and the connectors would be used more frequently, and perhaps with less care, than previous connectors.

Standard USB connectors have a minimum rated lifetime of 1,500 cycles of insertion and removal, and this increased to 5,000 cycles for Mini-B connectors. The rating for all Micro connectors is 10,000 cycles, and the same applies to USB-C. To accomplish this, a locking device was added and a leaf spring was moved from the jack to the plug, so that the most-stressed part is on the cable side of the connection. This change was made so that the connector on the less expensive, and more replaceable, cable would bear the most wear.

In standard USB, the electrical contacts in a USB connector are protected by an adjacent plastic tongue, and the entire connecting assembly is usually protected by an enclosing metal shell.

The shell on the plug makes contact with the receptacle before any of the internal pins. The shell is typically grounded, to dissipate static electricity and to shield the wires within the connector.

==== Compatibility ====
The USB standards specify dimensions and tolerances for connectors, to prevent physical incompatibilities, including maximum dimensions of plug bodies and minimum clear spaces around receptacles so that adjacent ports are not blocked.

==== Pin assignments ====
USB 1.0, 1.1, and 2.0 use two wires for power (V_{BUS} and GND) and two wires for one differential signal carrying serial data. Mini and Micro connectors have five contacts each, rather than the four of Standard connectors, with the additional contact, designated ID, electrically differentiating A and B plugs when connecting to the AB receptacles of On-The-Go devices. The Type‑C plug of a Type‑C-to-legacy cable or adapter is similarly electronically marked as A or B: In a cable, it is marked as the complement of the connector on the opposite end because every legacy cable by definition has an A and a B end, and in an adapter the Type‑C plug is marked to match the plug the adapter accepts.

USB 3.0 added a (bi-directional) lane (two additional differential pairs with a total of four wires, SSTx+, SSTx−, SSRx+ and SSRx−), providing full-duplex data transfers at SuperSpeed, making it similar to Serial ATA or single-lane PCI Express.

USB 2 Standard, Mini-, and Micro-USB plugs shown end-on, not to scale. Light areas represent cavities.

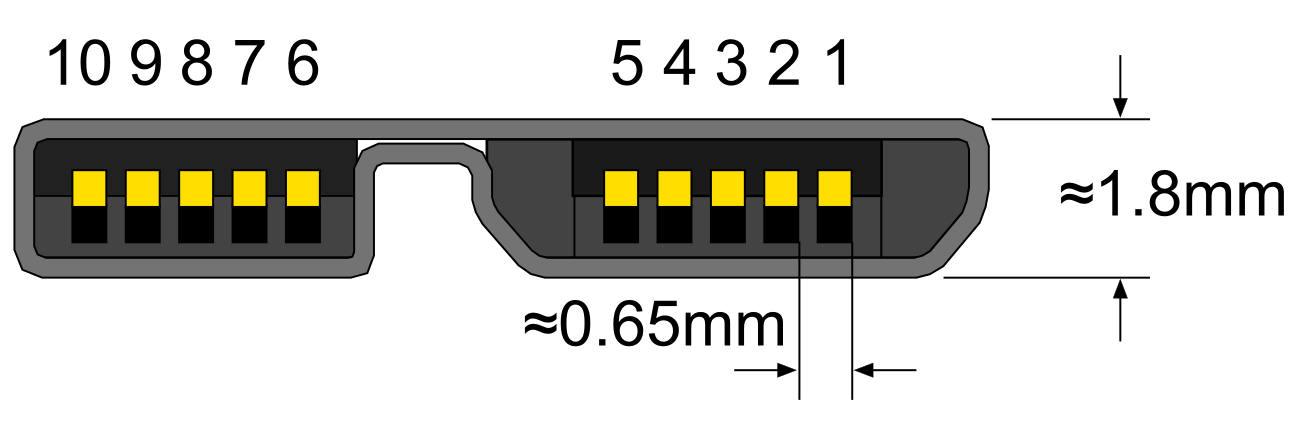
Micro-B SuperSpeed plug (shown inverted): 1. Power (V_{BUS}, 5 V); 2. Data− (D−); 3. Data+ (D+); 4. ID (On-The-Go); 5. GND; 6. SuperSpeed transmit− (SSTx−); 7. SuperSpeed transmit+ (SSTx+); 8. GND; 9. SuperSpeed receive− (SSRx−); 10. SuperSpeed receive+ (SSRx+)

Standard USB pin assignments
Pin	Name	Wire color (Note: In some sources D+ and D− are erroneously swapped.)		Description
1	V_{BUS}	Red or	Orange	+5 V
2	D−	White or	Gold	Data−
3	D+	Green		Data+
4	GND	Black or	Blue	Ground

Mini- and Micro-USB pin assignments
Pin	Name	Wire color	Description
1	V_{BUS}	Red	+5 V
2	D−	White	Data−
3	D+	Green	Data+
4	ID	None (only used in connectors, not cables)	When a cable is connected to a Mini- or Micro-AB receptacle, the ID pin indicates to the On-The-Go device whether the plug is the Type-A (host) or Type-B (peripheral device) end of its cable, causing the device to behave as a host or peripheral accordingly.: Type-A plug (host end): connected to GND; Type-B plug (peripheral device end): not connected
5	GND	Black	Signal ground

==== Colors ====
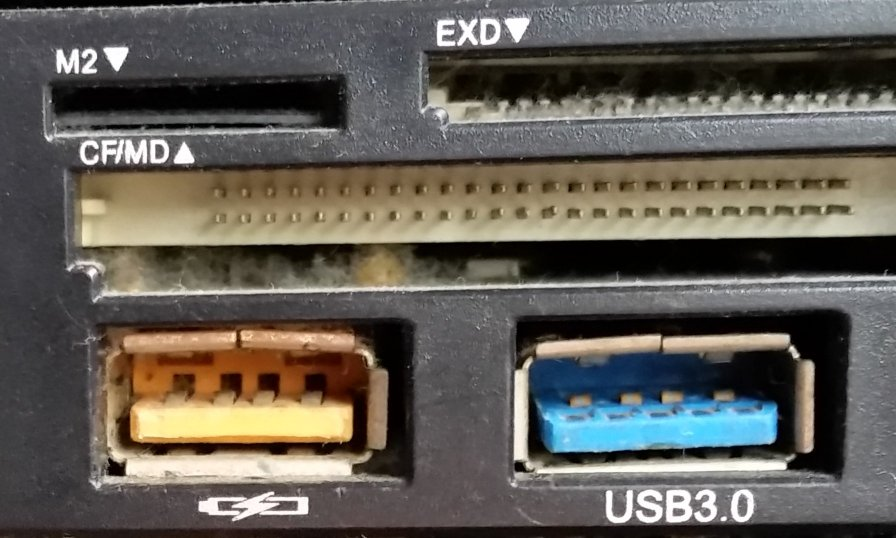
A yellow charge-only "USB" Type-A receptacle and a USB 3.0 Type-A receptacle, both upside-down, on a front panel with card reader

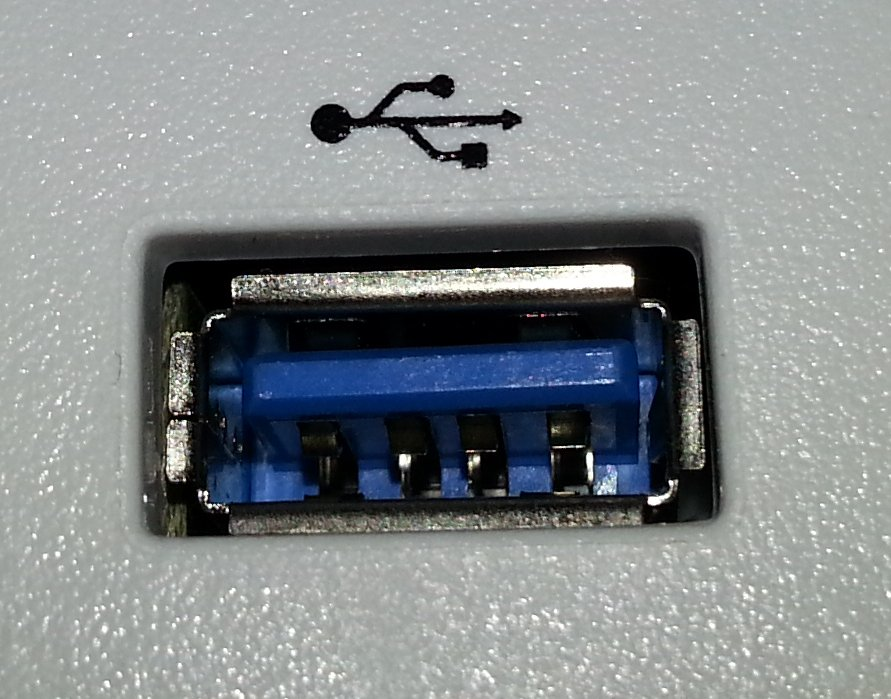
A blue Standard-A USB receptacle without USB 3.0 contacts fitted

Usual USB color-coding
Color	Location	Description
White (required by USB standards)	Receptacles and plugs	USB 1.0/1.1: Low-Speed (1.5 Mbit/s) – Full-Speed (12 Mbit/s); Micro‑A, Mini‑A
Black (required by USB standards)	Receptacles and plugs	USB 2.0: Hi-Speed USB (480 Mbit/s); Micro‑B, Mini‑B
Gray (required by USB standards)	Receptacles	Micro‑AB, Mini‑AB
Blue (Pantone 300 C) (recommended in USB standards)	Receptacles and plugs	Indicates a Standard‑A connector that supports USB 5Gbps (introduced as SuperSpeed in USB 3.0), and possibly USB 10Gbps (introduced in USB 3.1)
Teal blue (not part of USB standards)	Receptacles and plugs	Indicates a Standard‑A or Standard‑B connector that supports USB 10Gbps (introduced as SuperSpeed+ in USB 3.1)
Green (not part of USB standards)	Receptacles and plugs	Type‑A or Type‑B, Qualcomm Quick Charge (QC)
Purple (not part of USB standards)	Plugs only	Type‑A or Type‑C, Huawei SuperCharge
Yellow or red (not part of USB standards)	Receptacles only	Red: Usually Always On Yellow: Always On, Passive Power Delivery; High-current or sleep-and-charge
Orange (not part of USB standards)	Receptacles only	Always On, Passive Power Delivery; High-retention connector, mostly used on industrial hardware

USB ports and connectors are often color-coded to distinguish their different capabilities and modes. Color coding is only required for the insulators visible inside Micro and Mini connectors: A connectors are white, B black, and AB receptacles, which accept both A and B plugs, gray. Pantone 300 C is recommended for USB 3.0 Standard‑A connectors, including those with signalling rate of 5 Gbit/s and 10 Gbit/s, though some manufacturers instead use nonstandard teal for receptacles with signalling rate of 10 Gbit/s.

=== Types ===
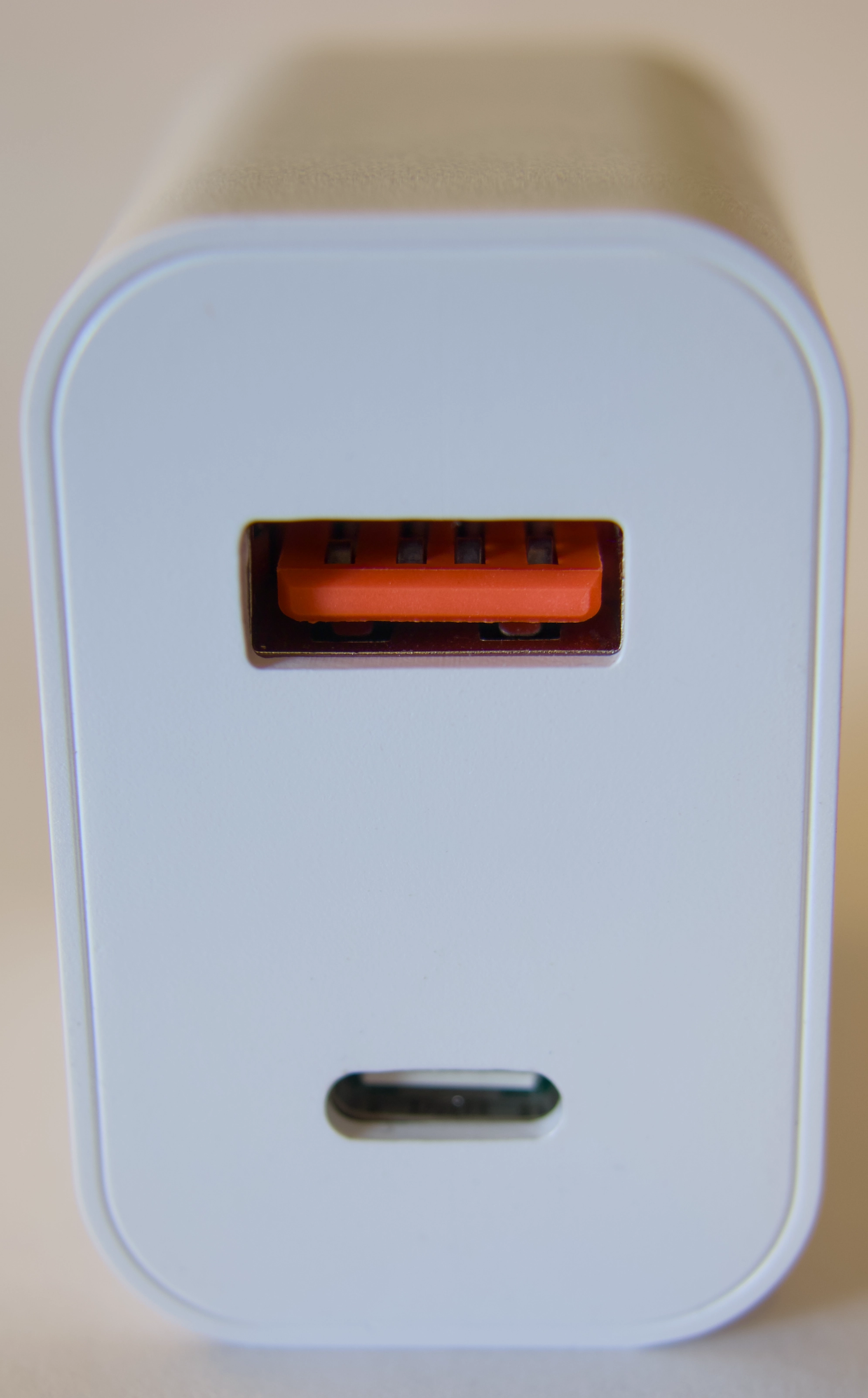
USB 2 Standard‑A receptacle (top) and USB-C receptacle (bottom)

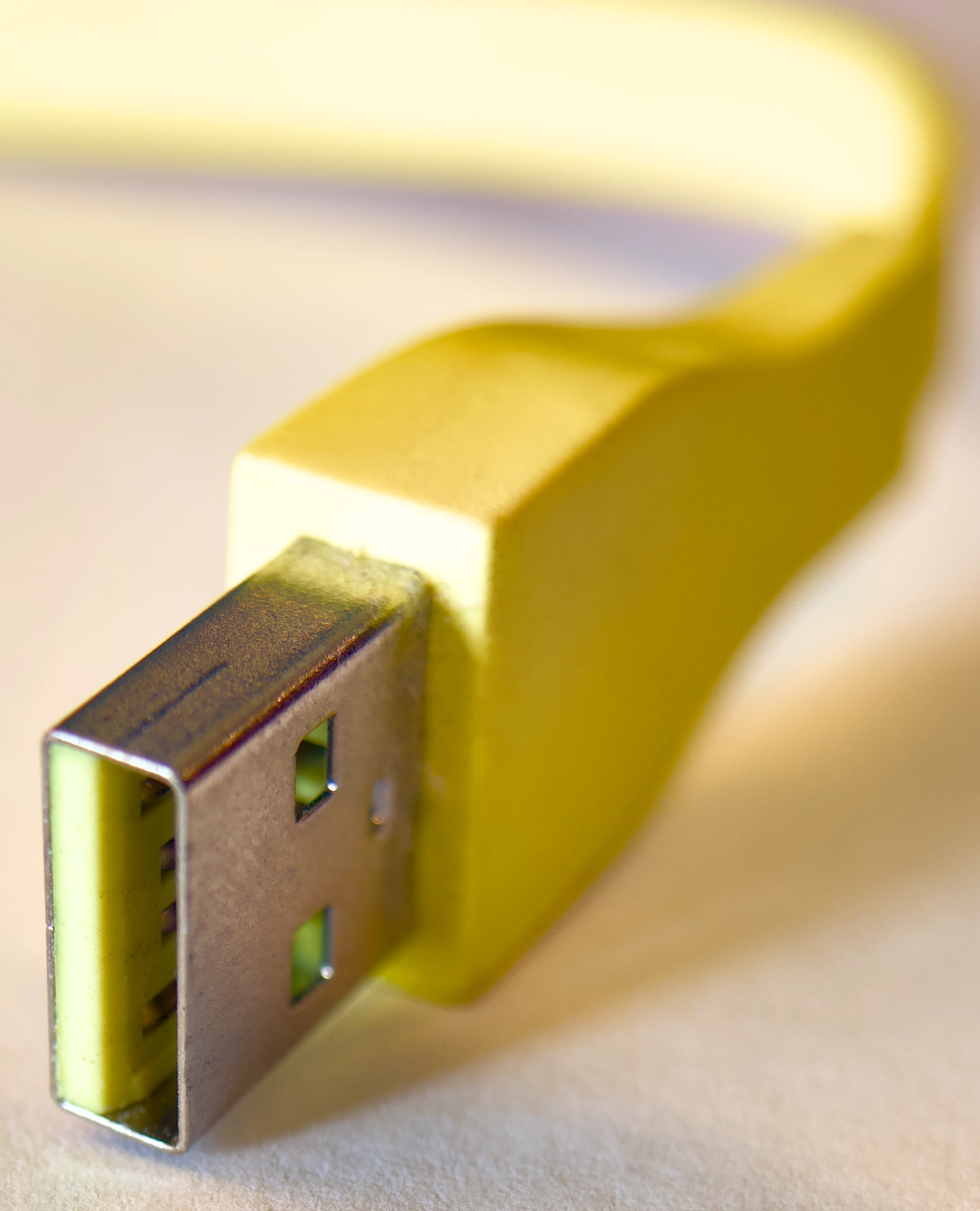
USB 2 Standard‑A plug

USB connector types multiplied as the specification progressed. The original USB specification detailed Standard-A and Standard-B plugs and receptacles, then referred to as simply Type‑A and Type‑B, then as other Type‑A and Type‑B connectors were added (first Mini, then Micro), the terms Standard‑A and Standard‑B were applied to the original connectors. The A–B distinction is to enforce the directional architecture of USB, with only the host and hubs having Type‑A receptacles and each peripheral device having a Type‑B. The data pins in the standard plugs are recessed compared to the power pins so that power and grounding is established before the data conductors are connected, and the reverse when unplugging. Some devices operate in different modes depending on whether the data connection is made. Charging docks supply power and do not include a host device or data pins, allowing any capable USB device to charge or operate from a standard USB cable. Charging cables provide power connections but not data. In a charge-only cable, the data wires are shorted at the device end; otherwise, the device may reject the charger as unsuitable.

==== Type‑C (USB-C) ====
The Full-Featured USB-C receptacle (left) and plug (right)

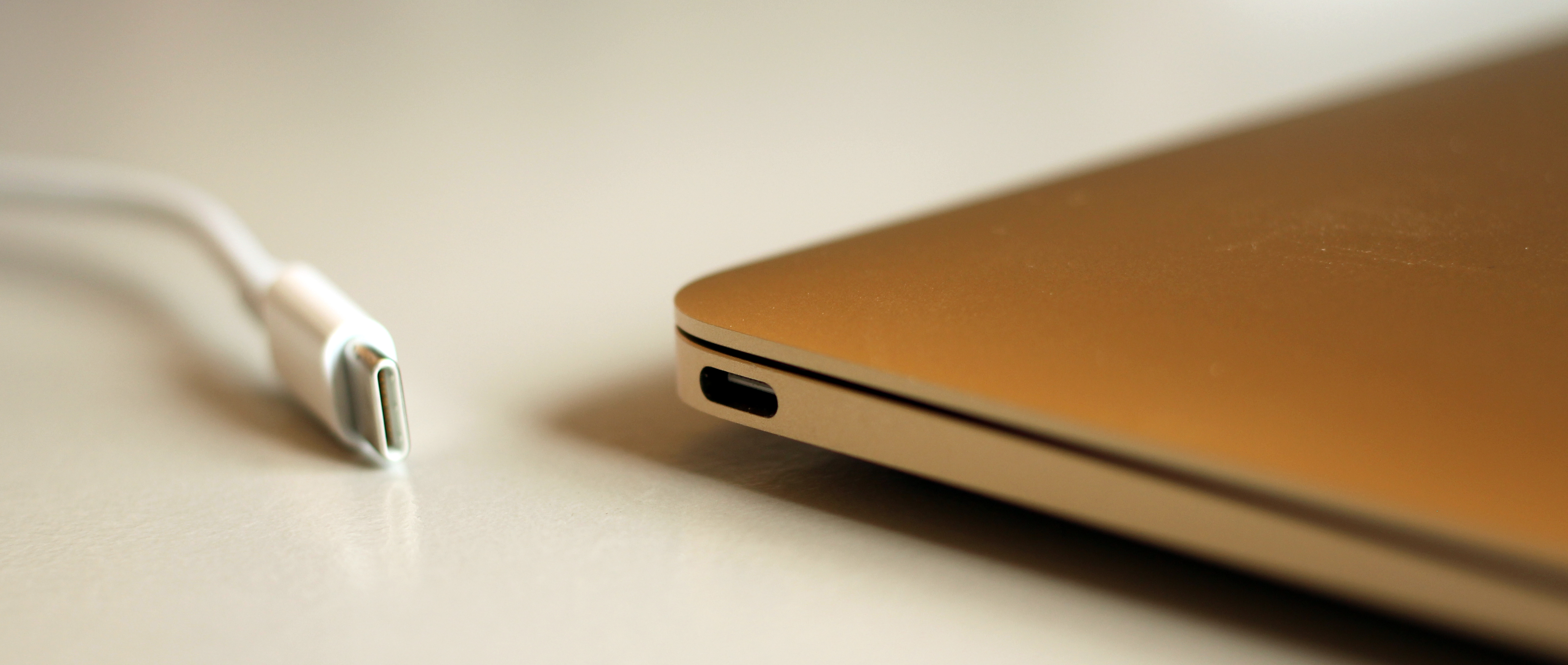
A cable with a USB‑C plug, and a USB-C port on a notebook computer

The USB-C connector supersedes all earlier USB connectors, the Mini DisplayPort connector (used for earlier Thunderbolt), and, since 2025, the Lightning connector. It is used for all USB protocols and for Thunderbolt (3 and later), DisplayPort (1.2 and later), and others. Developed at roughly the same time as the USB 3.1 specification, but distinct from it, the USB-C Specification 1.0 was finalized in August 2014 and defined a new small reversible connector for all USB and some other devices. The USB-C plug connects both to hosts and to peripheral devices, as well as to chargers and power supplies, replacing all of the preceding USB connectors with a standard meant to be future-proof.

The 24-pin double-sided connector provides four power–ground pairs, two differential pairs for USB 2.0 data (though only one pair is implemented in a USB-C cable), four pairs for SuperSpeed data bus (only two pairs are used in USB 3.1 mode), two "sideband use" pins, V_{CONN} +5 V power for active cables, and a configuration pin for cable orientation detection and dedicated biphase mark code (BMC) configuration data channel (CC). Type-A and Type-B adaptors and cables are required for older hosts and devices to plug into USB-C hosts and devices. Adapters and cables with a USB-C receptacle are not allowed.

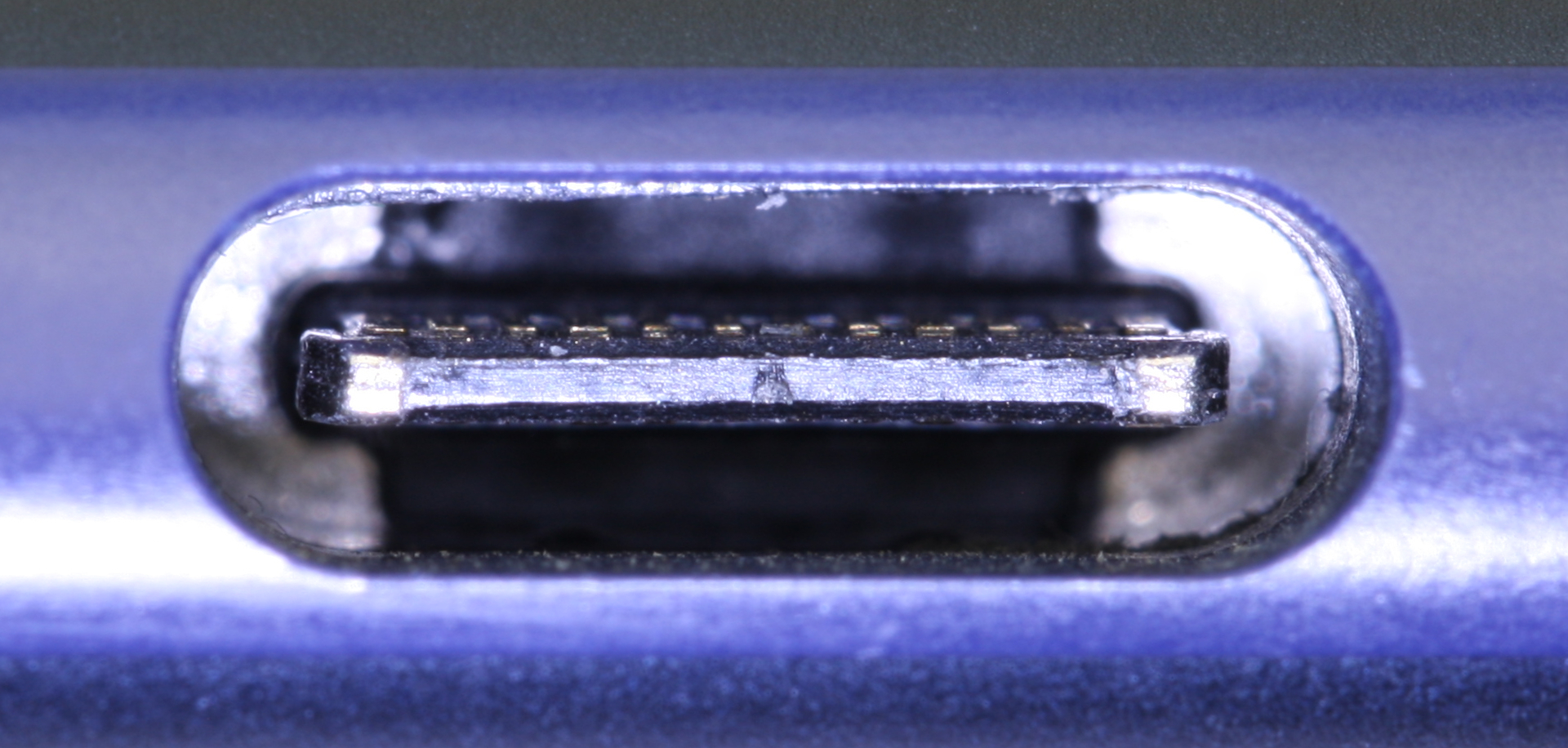
A USB-C port on a cell phone

A Full-Featured USB cable is a Type‑C-to-Type‑C cable that supports USB 2.0, USB 3.2 and USB4 data operation, and a Full-Featured Type‑C receptacle likewise supports the same full set of protocols. It contains a full set of wires and is electronically marked (E-marked): It contains an E-marker chip that responds to the USB Power Delivery Discover Identity command, a kind of vendor-defined message (VDM) sent over the configuration data channel (CC). Using this command, the cable reports its current capacity, maximum speed, and other parameters. Full-Featured USB Type-C devices are a mechanic prerequisite for multi-lane operation (USB 3.2 Gen 1×2, USB 3.2 Gen 2×2, USB4 2×2, USB4 3×2, USB Gen 4 Asymmetric).

USB-C devices support power currents of 1.5 A and 3.0 A over the 5 V power bus in addition to baseline 900 mA. These higher currents can be negotiated through the configuration line. Devices can also use the full Power Delivery specification using both BMC-coded configuration line and the legacy BFSK-coded V_{BUS} line.

==== Legacy USB connectors ====
In 2014, with the release of USB Type‑C (USB‑C), which replaces all other USB connectors, the USB Implementers Forum designated all prior connectors – Standard, Micro, and Mini – legacy.

===== Standard connectors =====
The USB Standard connectors, the first and largest of the legacy connectors (receptacles left, plugs right): USB 3 Standard‑A (top), USB 2 Standard‑A, USB 3 Standard‑B (center), Powered‑B (left and right), and USB 2 Standard‑B (bottom)

Pin configuration of Standard‑A and Standard‑B plugs viewed end-on. (Both shapes are inaccurate.)

- Standard‑A connectors: This plug has an elongated rectangular cross-section, inserts into a Standard‑A receptacle on a downstream facing port (DFP) on a USB host or hub, and carries both power and data. The plug itself is 12 mm wide and 4.5 mm thick.
- Standard‑B connectors: This plug has a near square cross-section with the top exterior corners beveled. As part of a removable cable, it inserts into a single upstream facing port (UFP) on a device, such as a printer. On some devices, the Standard‑B receptacle has no data connections, being used solely for accepting power from the downstream device. This two-connector-type scheme (A–B) prevents a user from accidentally creating a loop.

The maximum allowed cross-section of the overmold boot (which is part of the connector used for its handling) is 16 by 8 mm (0.63 by 0.31 in) for the Standard-A plug type, while for the Standard‑B it is 11.5 by 10.5 mm (0.45 by 0.41 in).

===== Mini connectors =====
The USB Mini connectors, showing their required insulator colors (A, white; B, black; AB, grey): Mini‑AB (left), Mini‑A (top center), and Mini‑B (bottom center) receptacles, and Mini‑A (top right) and Mini‑B (bottom right) plugs. The Mini‑A and ‑AB connectors are deprecated, the ‑B connectors legacy.

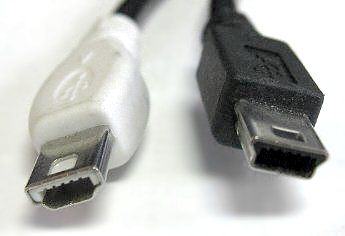
Mini-A (left) and Mini-B (right) plugs

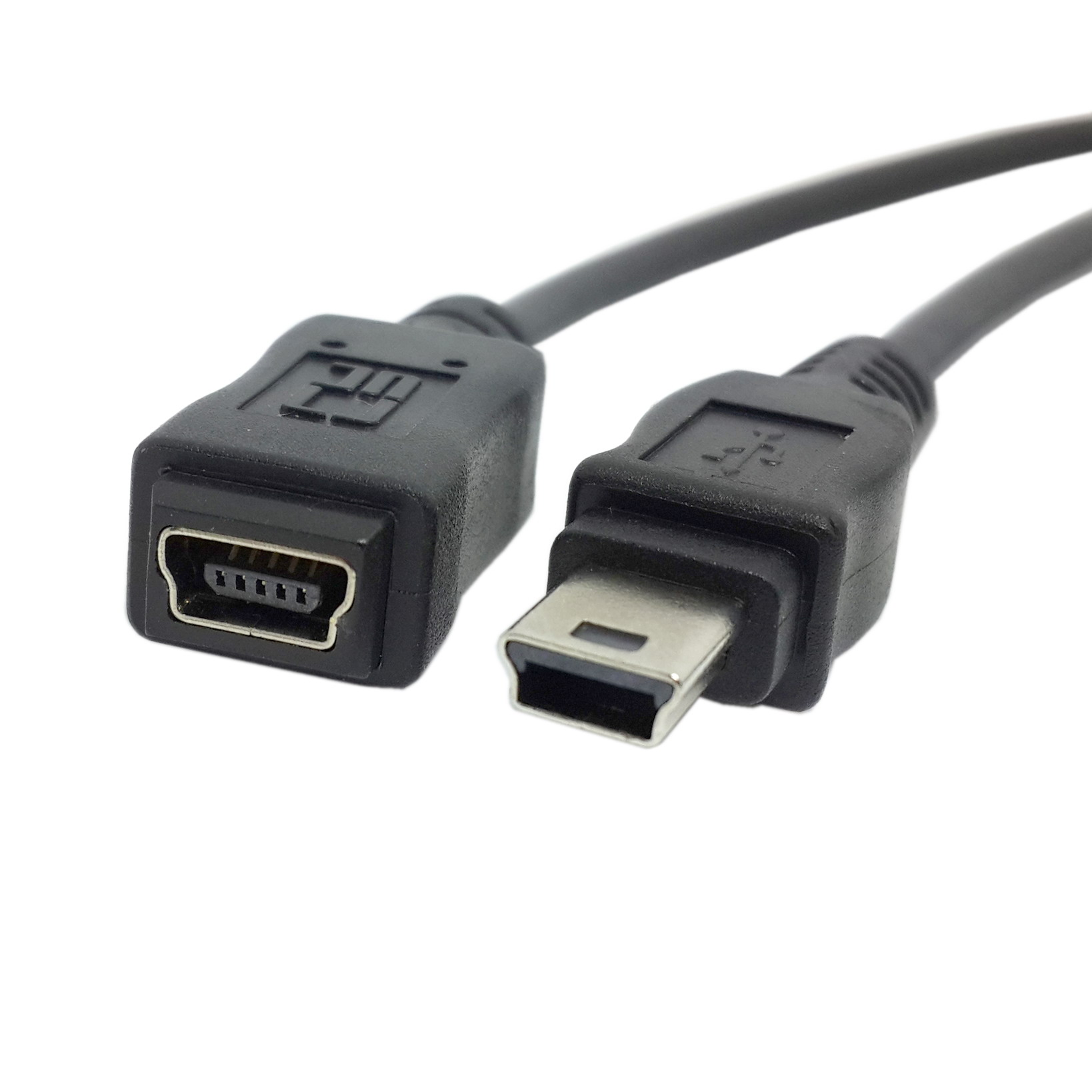
USB Mini-B plug (right) and receptacle (left)

Mini-USB connectors were introduced together with USB 2.0 in April 2000, mostly used with smaller devices such as digital cameras, smartphones, and tablet computers. Both Mini-A and Mini-B plugs are approximately 3 by 7 mm (0.12 by 0.28 in).

The Mini-A connectors and the Mini-AB receptacle were deprecated in May 2007, meaning their use in new products has been prohibited since then. The more common Mini-B connectors are still permitted, but they are not On-The-Go–compliant and cannot be certified; the Mini-B connector was common for transferring data to and from early smartphones and PDAs, and it appears on devices including the PlayStation Portable and the Motorola Razr V3, where it also acts as a charger on the latter.

The Mini-AB receptacle accepts either the Mini-A or the Mini-B plug, causing the On-The-Go device to behave as a host (A) or peripheral (B) accordingly.

===== Micro connectors =====
The legacy USB Micro connectors, showing their required insulator coloring (A, white; B, black; AB, grey): USB 3 and USB 2 Micro‑AB receptacles (upper left), Micro‑B receptacles (lower left), Micro‑A plugs (upper right), and Micro‑B plugs (lower right). All USB 3 receptacles also accept USB 2 plugs; Type‑AB receptacles accept both Type‑A and Type‑B plugs. There are no Micro‑A receptacles.

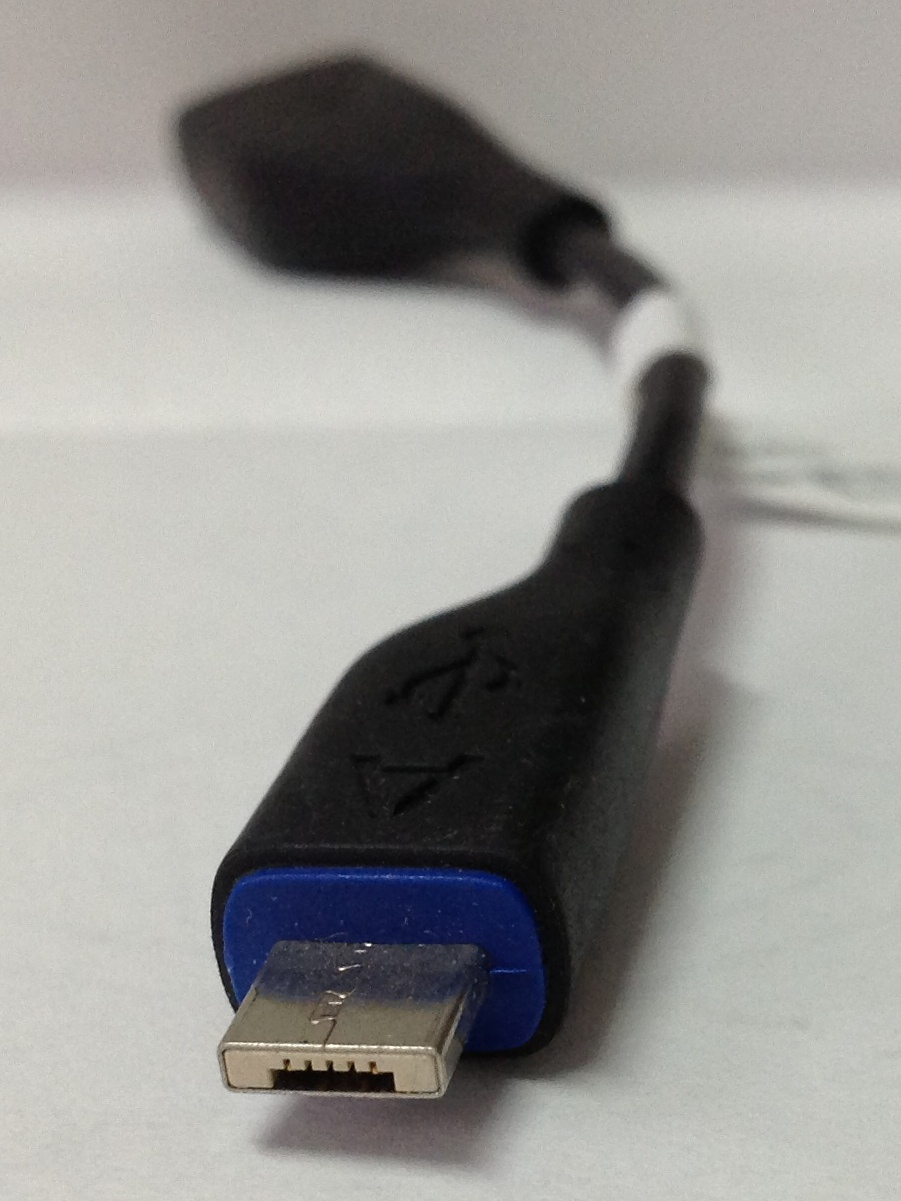
Micro-A plug, with the required visible white insulator

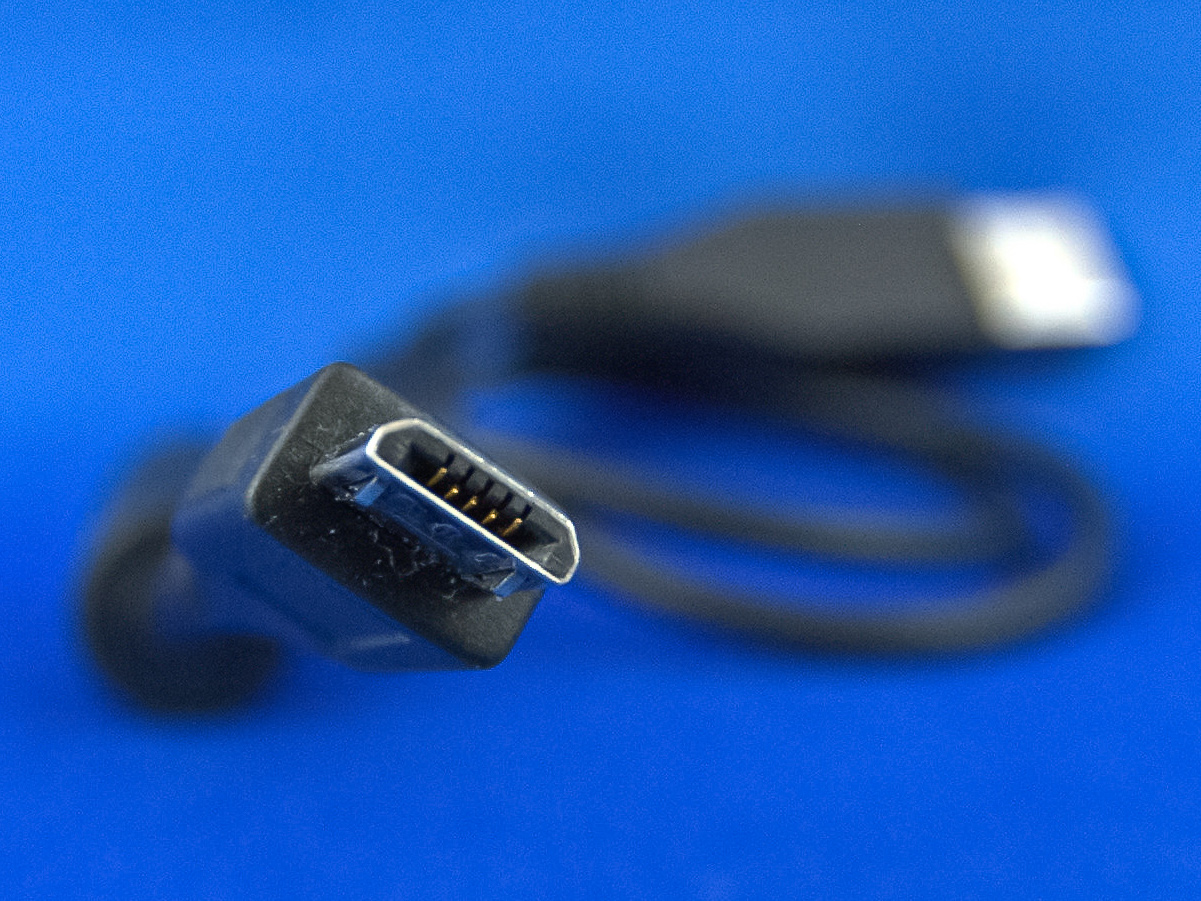
Micro-B plug, with the required visible black insulator

Micro-USB connectors, which were announced by the USB-IF on January 4, 2007, have a width similar to that of Mini-USB but approximately half the thickness, enabling their integration into thinner portable devices. The Micro-A plug is 6.85 by 1.80 mm (0.270 by 0.071 in) with a maximum plug body size of 11.7 by 8.5 mm (0.46 by 0.33 in), while the Micro-B plug has the same height and width with a slightly smaller maximum plug body size of 10.6 by 8.5 mm (0.42 by 0.33 in). In 2009, several phone manufacturers in europe agreed to standarize on Micro USB for charging, replacing 30 proprietary charging connectors.

The thinner Micro-USB connectors were intended to replace the Mini connectors in devices manufactured from May 2007 through late 2014, including smartphones, personal digital assistants, and cameras.

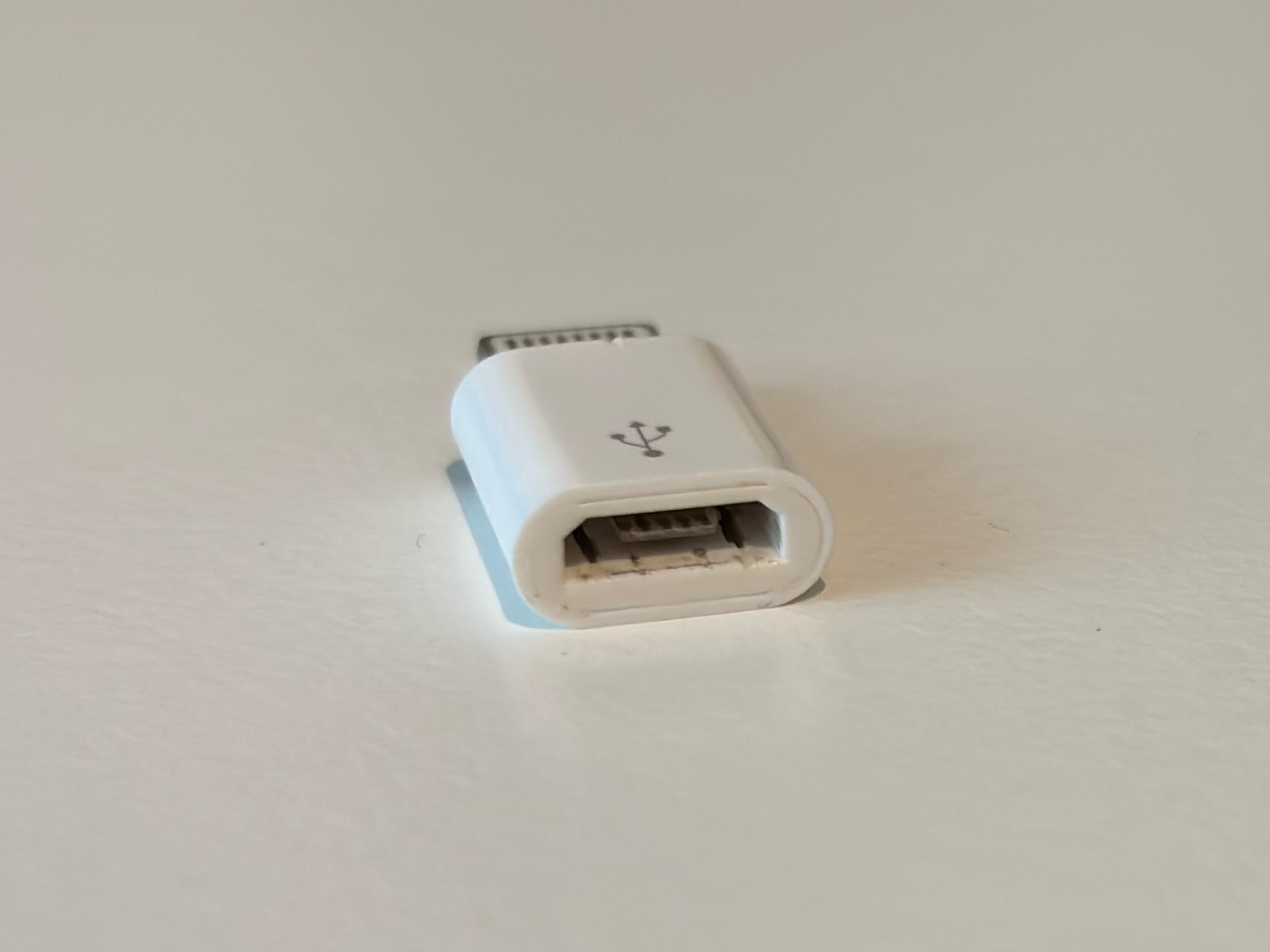
An adapter with a Micro‑B receptacle and Lightning plug

The Micro plug design is rated for at least 10,000 connect–disconnect cycles, which is more than the Mini plug design. The Micro connector is also designed to reduce the mechanical wear on the device; instead, the easier-to-replace cable is designed to bear more of the mechanical wear of connection and disconnection. The Universal Serial Bus Micro-USB Cables and Connectors Specification details the mechanical characteristics of Micro-A plugs, Micro-AB receptacles (which accept both Micro-A and Micro-B plugs), and Micro-B plugs and receptacles, along with a permitted adapter with a Standard-A receptacle and a Micro-A plug, as would be used e.g. to connect a camera to an existing Standard-A–B cable attached to a desktop printer.

Despite the introduction of the USB-C plug (see below), the Micro-B plug continues to be fitted on certain, often budget, hardware.

====== OMTP standard ======
Micro-USB was endorsed as the standard connector for data and power on mobile devices by the cellular phone carrier group Open Mobile Terminal Platform (OMTP) in 2007.

Micro-USB was embraced as the "Universal Charging Solution" by the International Telecommunication Union (ITU) in October 2009.

In Europe, Micro-USB became the defined common external power supply (EPS) for use with smartphones sold in the EU, and 14 of the world's largest mobile phone manufacturers signed the EU's common EPS Memorandum of Understanding (MoU). Apple, one of the original MoU signers, makes Micro-USB adapters available – as permitted in the Common EPS MoU – for its iPhones equipped with Apple's proprietary 30-pin dock connector and, later, Lightning connector.

===== USB 3.x connectors and backward compatibility =====
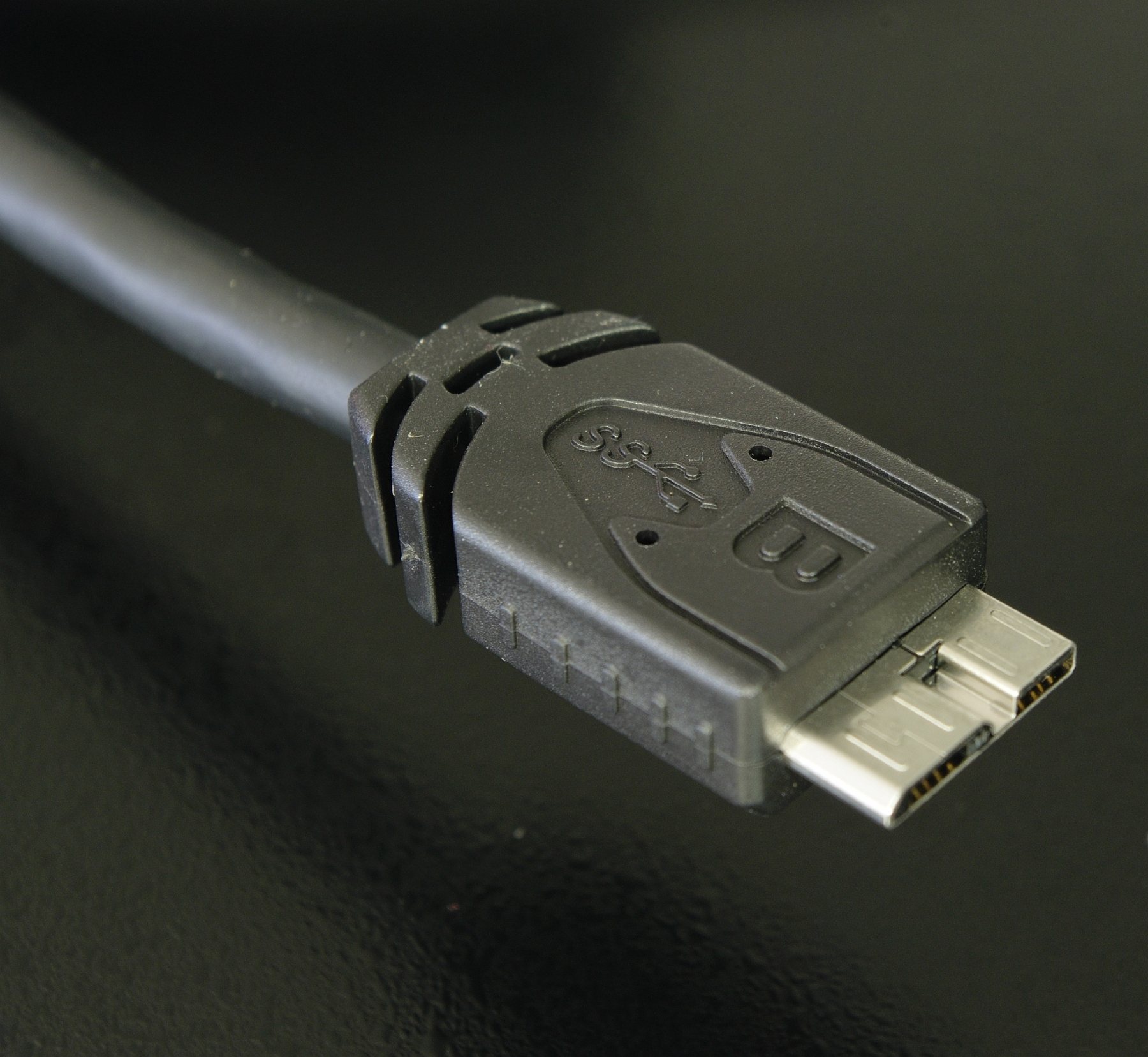
USB 3.0 (marketed as SuperSpeed) Micro-B plug

USB 3.0 introduced SuperSpeed plugs and receptacles, both Standard and Micro. All 3.0 SuperSpeed receptacles (Standard-A, Standard-B, Micro-B, and Micro-AB) are backward-compatible with the corresponding pre-3.0 plugs; additionally, the Standard-A SuperSpeed plug fits the pre-SuperSpeed Standard-A receptacle. (All other SuperSpeed plugs cannot be attached to pre-SuperSpeed receptacles.)

For any devices to have a SuperSpeed link, all the connectors between them must be Full-Featured Type‑C or SuperSpeed.

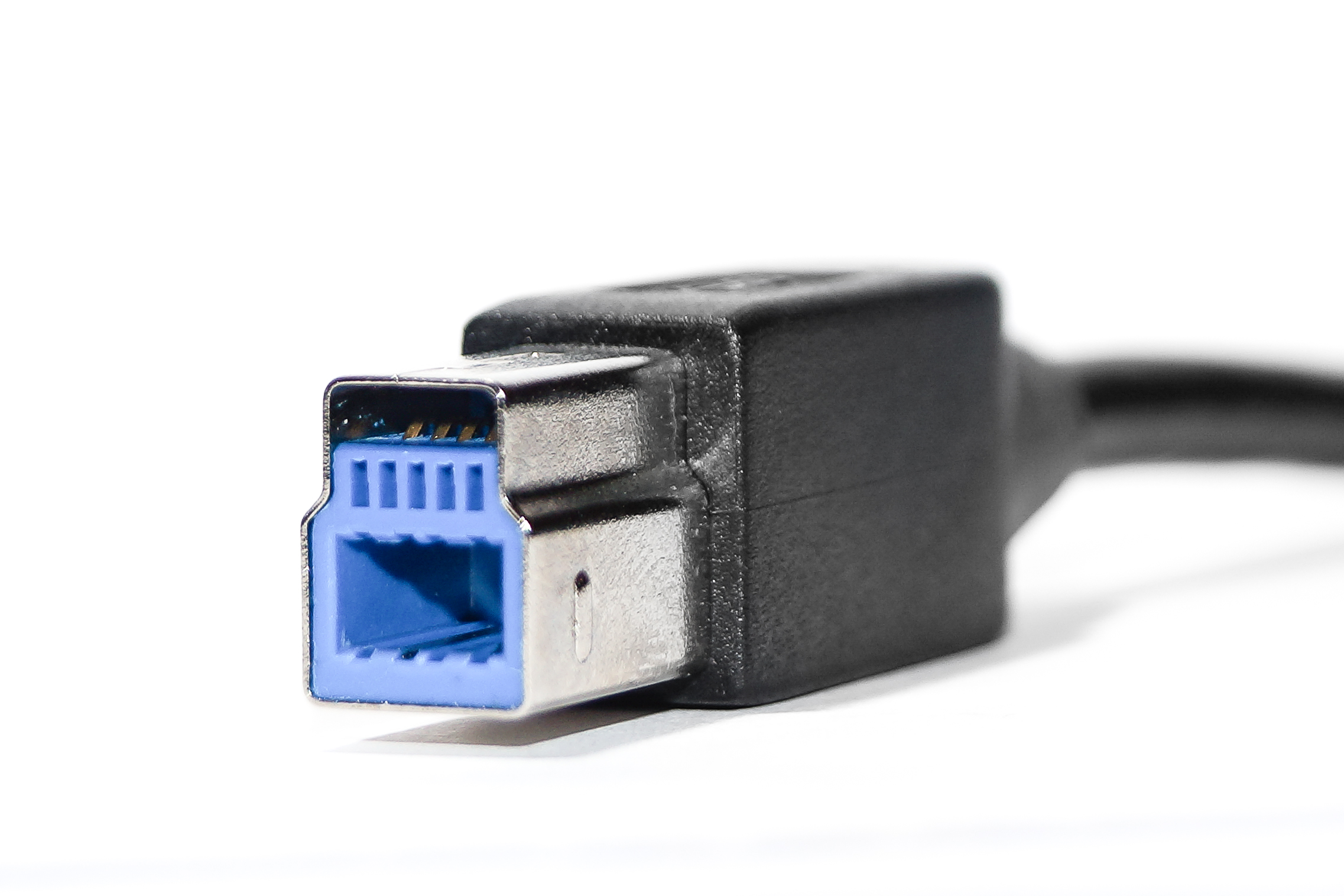
USB 3.0 (marketed as SuperSpeed) Standard-B plug

Every USB cable predating USB‑C had an A plug at one end and a B plug at the other (with the rare exception of one special A–A configuration with certain conductors omitted, for operating system debugging and other host-to-host connection applications). In a USB‑C-to-legacy cable, the Type‑C plug is electrically marked to take the role complementary to the connector at the opposite end, A for B and B for A. When a modern C–C cable is used, the two connected devices communicate to determine which takes which role.

===== USB On-The-Go connectors =====
Before USB‑C, USB On-The-Go (OTG) introduced the concept of a device that could switch roles, performing either the host (A) role or peripheral device (B) role, as needed, depending simply on which type of plug was attached. An OTG device was required to have one, and only one, USB connector: a Micro-AB receptacle or, before Micro-USB, a Mini-AB receptacle.

The Micro-AB receptacle is capable of accepting the Micro-A or Micro-B plug of any of the allowed cables and adapters as defined in revision 1.01 of the Micro-USB specification.

Since a Type-AB receptacle allows either an A or a B plug to be attached, each corresponding A and B plug design has an ID contact to indicate electrically whether the plug is the A or the B end of its cable: In an A plug the ID contact is connected to GND, and in a B plug it is not. Typically, a pull-up resistor in the device is used to detect the presence or absence of the GND connection.

An OTG device with an A plug inserted is called the A-device and is responsible for powering the USB interface when required, and by default assumes the role of host. An OTG device with a B plug inserted is called the B-device and by default assumes the role of peripheral. If an application on the On-The-Go device requires the host role when it has the peripheral device role, the Host Negotiation Protocol (HNP) is used to temporarily transfer the host role to the OTG device.

==== Dimensions ====
USB connector dimensions^{†}
Type	Receptacle			Plug			Notes
Type	Width (mm)	Height (mm)	Depth (mm)	Width (mm)	Height (mm)	Length, min (mm)	Notes
Standard-A	12.5	5.12	8.88	12.0	4.5	11.75	Original rectangular host-side full-size connector
USB 2 Standard-B	8.45	7.78	8.88	8.0	7.25	11.75	Square-shaped device-side full-size connector
USB 3 Standard-B	8.45	10.8	8.88	8.0	10.44	11.75	Square-shaped device-side full-size connector
Mini-B	6.9	3.1	5.5	6.8	3.0	6.8	Miniaturized connectors, trapezoidal shape for Mini-B
USB 2 Micro-B, Micro-A, Micro-AB	6.9	1.85	3.5	6.85	1.8	5.4	Thinner miniaturized connectors, trapezoidal shape for Micro-B
USB 3 Micro-B, Micro-A, Micro-AB	12.25	1.85	3.5	12.2	1.8	5.4	Thinner miniaturized connectors, trapezoidal shape for Micro-B
Type-C (USB-C)	8.34	2.56	6.2	8.25	2.4	6.51	Modern reversible plug with oval shape
† The receptacle dimensions are for the receptacle openings only and do not include the surrounding plastic or metal housing. The plug dimensions are the outer dimensions of the plug body metal mating part only and do not include the cable overmold or strain relief.

=== Compatibility ===
Before the specification of the Type‑C plug, every compliant USB cable had one Type‑A plug at one end and one Type‑B plug at the other. The Type‑A plug connects only downstream, either directly to a DFP of the host or indirectly, by connecting to a downstream-facing port (DFP) of a hub that itself connects, directly or indirectly, to the host. The Type‑B plug connects only upstream, either directly to the single upstream-facing port (UFP) of a peripheral device or to the UFP of a hub to which further hubs and peripheral devices can be connected. An On-The-Go device has a single Type‑AB port (either Micro‑AB or Mini‑AB) and takes either role according to the plug attached. In a Type‑C-to-legacy cable, the Type‑C plug is electronically marked to complement the plug at the opposite end: when the legacy plug is a Type‑A, the Type‑C plug is marked as B, and when the legacy plug is a Type‑B, the Type‑C is marked as A. A device with a Type‑C receptacle may be capable of taking either role or may only function as one or the other. If a Type‑C plug marked as A or B is connected to a device incapable of taking the necessary role, no communication occurs. When two devices, each capable of taking either role, are connected through a Type‑C–Type‑C cable, there is a negotiation to determine which is the A device and which is the B.

Connectors generally support protocols supported by preceding connector types.

USB plug compatibility (and capability)
Plug				Compatible receptacles			
Current	USB4 2.0 (Note: USB4 2.0: Up to 80 Gbit/s each direction, or 120 in either direction and 40 the other) / USB 3.2 (Note: USB 3.x: 20, 10, or 5 Gbit/s full-duplex, and USB 2.0: 480, 12, or 1.5 Mbit/s half-duplex) / USB4		Type‑C (Note: Also standard for Thunderbolt 3 and later. Also supports DisplayPort Alternate Mode.)	Type‑C			
Legacy	USB 3.x (Note: USB 3.x (one lane only): 10, or 5 Gbit/s full-duplex, and USB 2.0: 480, 12, or 1.5 Mbit/s half-duplex)	Host (Type‑A)	USB 3.0 Standard‑A	USB 3.0; Standard‑A		USB 2.0; Standard‑A (Note: Compatible, limited to the capabilities of USB 2.0) (Note: USB 2.0: 480, 12, or 1.5 Mbit/s half-duplex)	
Legacy	USB 3.x	Host (Type‑A)	USB 3.0 Micro‑A (Note: There is no Micro‑A–specific receptacle.)	USB 3.0; Micro‑AB (Note: A device with a Type‑AB receptacle accepts both Type‑A and Type‑B plugs and functions as either the host or a peripheral device accordingly: When a Type‑A plug is connected, it functions as the host; when a Type‑B plug is connected, as a peripheral device.)			
Legacy	USB 3.x	Peripheral (Type‑B)	USB 3.0 Standard‑B	USB 3.0; Standard‑B			
Legacy	USB 3.x	Peripheral (Type‑B)	USB 3.0 Micro‑B	USB 3.0; Micro‑AB		USB 3.0; Micro‑B	
Legacy	USB 2.0 and earlier	Host (Type‑A)	USB 2.0 Standard‑A	USB 3.0; Standard‑A		USB 2.0; Standard‑A	
Legacy	USB 2.0 and earlier	Host (Type‑A)	USB 2.0 Micro‑A	USB 3.0; Micro‑AB		USB 2.0; Micro‑AB	
Legacy	USB 2.0 and earlier	Host (Type‑A)	Mini‑A (Note: Deprecated)	Mini‑AB		Mini‑A	
Legacy	USB 2.0 and earlier	Peripheral (Type‑B)	USB 2.0 Standard‑B	USB 3.0; Standard‑B		USB 2.0; Standard‑B	
Legacy	USB 2.0 and earlier	Peripheral (Type‑B)	USB 2.0 Micro‑B	USB 3.0; Micro‑AB	USB 3.0; Micro‑B	USB 2.0; Micro‑AB	USB 2.0; Micro‑B
Legacy	USB 2.0 and earlier	Peripheral (Type‑B)	Mini‑B	Mini‑AB		Mini‑B	

USB receptacle compatibility (and capability)
Receptacle				Compatible plugs			
Current	USB4 2.0 / USB 3.2 / USB4		Type‑C A Full-Featured Type‑C receptacle: an opening 8 by 2.5 millimeters Fwith an insulator carrying many contacts floating in the center. (It is also possible for a Type‑C receptacle to simply be the insulator with contacts exposed, with no shell surrounding.) All contacts are present, twelve on each side of the flat insulator. Type‑C plugs only vary in which contacts are present inside so cannot be distinguished by touch.	Type‑C A Full-Featured Type‑C plug: a smooth metal shell, 8 by 2.5 millimeters, with rounded sides and rounded edges at the facing end. The end has a narrow slot with all contacts inside. The Full-Featured plug has six shield-contact springs, all more prominent than the four in the other Type‑C plugs, and all contacts are present except the center pair on one side. Type‑C plugs only vary in which contacts are present inside; they cannot be distinguished by touch and are difficult to discern visually without magnification.			
Legacy	USB 3.x	Host (Type‑A)	USB 3.0 Standard‑A	USB 3.0; Standard‑A		USB 2.0; Standard‑A	
Legacy	USB 3.x	Peripheral (Type‑B)	USB 3.0 Standard‑B	USB 3.0; Standard‑B		USB 2.0; Standard‑B	
Legacy	USB 3.x	Peripheral (Type‑B)	USB 3.0 Micro‑B	USB 3.0; Micro‑B		USB 2.0; Micro‑B	
Legacy	USB 3.x	On-The-Go (Type‑AB)	USB 3.0 Micro‑AB	USB 3.0; Micro‑A	USB 3.0; Micro‑B	USB 2.0; Micro‑A	USB 2.0; Micro‑B
Legacy	USB 2.0 and earlier	Host (Type‑A)	USB 2.0 Standard‑A	USB 3.0; Standard‑A		USB 2.0; Standard‑A	
Legacy	USB 2.0 and earlier	Host (Type‑A)	Mini‑A	Mini‑A			
Legacy	USB 2.0 and earlier	Peripheral (Type‑B)	USB 2.0 Standard‑B	USB 2.0; Standard‑B			
Legacy	USB 2.0 and earlier	Peripheral (Type‑B)	USB 2.0 Micro‑B	USB 2.0; Micro‑B			
Legacy	USB 2.0 and earlier	Peripheral (Type‑B)	Mini‑B	Mini‑B			
Legacy	USB 2.0 and earlier	On-The-Go (Type‑AB)	USB 2.0 Micro‑AB	USB 2.0; Micro‑A		USB 2.0; Micro‑B	
Legacy	USB 2.0 and earlier	On-The-Go (Type‑AB)	Mini‑AB	Mini‑A		Mini‑B	

Remarks:

USB cables and capabilities, by connector type Illustrations to scale
Plug at A end (host) (Note: Every legacy USB cable has an A end and a B end, with the exception of a single special Type‑A–Type‑A cable type for operating system debugging and other host-to-host connection applications: This cable has a USB 3.0 Standard‑A plug at each end but with no connections for power (V_{BUS}) or for the legacy data channel of USB 2 and USB 1 (D−, D+). This exception, while safe, has no common application. Also there are valid A-to-A assemblies, referred to loosely as cables (such as the Easy Transfer Cable), which are actually not simply cables but active peripheral devices: In USB terms, such a product is two peripherals, each one seen by one of the hosts to which the "cable" is connected.) (Note: Some devices, e.g. some smartphones, are defectively designed in that they can function as USB hosts, not just as peripheral devices, except that they have, incorrectly, Micro‑B or Mini‑B receptacles instead of ‑AB receptacles. Nonstandard cables to connect peripheral devices to these defective devices exist: Such a cable has a proper Type‑B plug at one end and at the other a plug electrically marked Type‑A that is mechanically Type‑B, allowing insertion and causing such a defective device to take the host role. When connected to a valid device that correctly has a Type‑B receptacle damage is unlikely since all Type‑B ports are unpowered by default, but no communication occurs.) Plug at B end (peripheral)		Current	Legacy				Deprecated
Plug at A end (host) Plug at B end (peripheral)		Type-C A Full-Featured Type‑C plug: a smooth metal shell, 8 by 2.5 millimeters, with rounded sides and rounded edges at the facing end. The end has a narrow slot with all contacts inside. The Full-Featured plug has 6 shield-contact springs, all more prominent than the four in the other Type‑C plugs, and all contacts are present except the center pair on one side. Type‑C plugs only vary in which contacts are present inside; they cannot be distinguished by touch and are difficult to discern visually without magnification.	USB 3.0 Standard‑A	USB 3.0 Micro‑A	USB 2.0 Standard‑A	USB 2.0 Micro‑A	Mini‑A
Current	Type‑C A Full-Featured Type‑C plug: a smooth metal shell, 8 by 2.5 millimeters, with rounded sides and rounded edges at the facing end. The end has a narrow slot with all contacts inside. The Full-Featured plug has 6 shield-contact springs more prominent than in other Type‑C plugs, and all contacts are present except the center pair on one side. Type‑C plugs only vary in which contacts are present inside so cannot be distinguished by touch.	Up to 80 Gbit/s, or 120 Gbit/s either direction and 40 the other (USB4 Gen 4)	Up to 10 Gbit/s (USB 3.2 Gen 2×1)	Prohibited (Note: A cable with a Type‑C plug and a plug that fits an Type‑AB receptacle (i.e. Micro or Mini) can be confusing in that the directionality of the cable may be unclear and its directionality determines whether an attached device takes the host or peripheral device role. To avoid this problem, the Type‑C connector is always the A end of such cables with the other end a Micro‑B or a Mini‑B. Type‑C–Micro‑A and Type‑C–Mini‑A cables are prohibited.) (Note: The USB standards do not allow cables with every combination of one Type‑A and one Type‑B plug, and nonstandard cables cannot be certified or marked with USB logos. However, cables with non-standard combinations of plugs exist. Provided that one end is logically A (with a Type-A or Type-C plug) and the other logically B (with a Type‑B type or Type‑C plug) a cable may function.)	Up to 480 Mbit/s half duplex (USB 2.0)	Prohibited	Prohibited
Legacy	USB 3.0 Standard‑B	Up to 10 Gbit/s (USB 3.2 Gen 2×1)	Up to 10 Gbit/s (USB 3.2 Gen 2×1)		—N/a		
Legacy	USB 3.0 Micro‑B	Up to 10 Gbit/s (USB 3.2 Gen 2×1)	Up to 10 Gbit/s (USB 3.2 Gen 2×1)		—N/a		
Legacy	USB 2.0 Standard‑B	Up to 480 Mbit/s half duplex (USB 2.0)	—N/a		Up to 480 Mbit/s half duplex (USB 2.0)	Prohibited (Note: There is no standard cable to directly connect a peripheral device with a Standard‑B or Mini‑B port directly to an On-The-Go host. Instead, a cable with a Standard‑A plug is used, and the Standard‑A plug is connected to a (specifically allowed) adapter that connects to the Micro‑AB receptacle of the On-The-Go host.)	Prohibited
Legacy	USB 2.0 Micro‑B	Up to 480 Mbit/s half duplex (USB 2.0)	—N/a		Up to 480 Mbit/s half duplex (USB 2.0)	Up to 480 Mbit/s half duplex (USB 2.0)	Prohibited
Legacy	Mini‑B	Up to 480 Mbit/s half duplex (USB 2.0)	—N/a		Up to 480 Mbit/s half duplex (USB 2.0)	Prohibited	Prohibited

In addition to the above cable assemblies comprising two plugs, receptacles are allowed in three adapter assemblies:

- Two legacy adapter assemblies for compatibility with equipment that predates USB‑C:
  - USB 3.1 Standard‑A receptacle to Type‑C plug, to connect a legacy Standard‑A plug to a modern Type‑C receptacle
  - USB 2.0 Micro‑B receptacle to Type‑C plug, to connect a legacy Micro‑B plug to a modern Type‑C receptacle
- One older adapter, itself designated legacy, predating USB‑C: Standard‑A receptacle to Micro‑A plug, giving a compact On-The-Go device, such as a camera or smartphone, a Standard‑A port for connecting peripherals, such as printers and mass storage devices. That is, to connect a Standard‑A plug to a Micro‑AB receptacle. (All USB connectors except Type‑C were designated legacy in 2014.)

USB adapters, by connector type
Plug Legacy receptacle	Current	Legacy
Plug Legacy receptacle	Type‑C A Full-Featured Type‑C plug: a smooth metal shell, 8 by 2.5 millimeters, with rounded sides and rounded edges at the facing end. The end has a narrow slot with all contacts inside. The Full-Featured plug has six shield-contact springs, all more prominent than the four in the other Type‑C plugs, and all contacts are present except the center pair on one side. Type‑C plugs only vary in which contacts are present inside; they cannot be distinguished by touch and are difficult to discern visually without magnification.	USB 2.0 Micro‑A
USB 3.0 Standard‑A	Up to 10 Gbit/s (USB 3.2 Gen 2×1) to connect a legacy peripheral device to a Type‑C host	—N/a
USB 2.0 Micro‑B	Up to 480 Mbit/s half duplex (USB 2.0) to connect a legacy charger or host to a Type‑C power sink (consumer, e.g. a cell phone or computer) or peripheral device	—N/a
USB 2.0 Standard‑A	—N/a	Up to 480 Mbit/s half duplex (USB 2.0) to connect a peripheral device to an On-The-Go device

=== Internal connectors ===
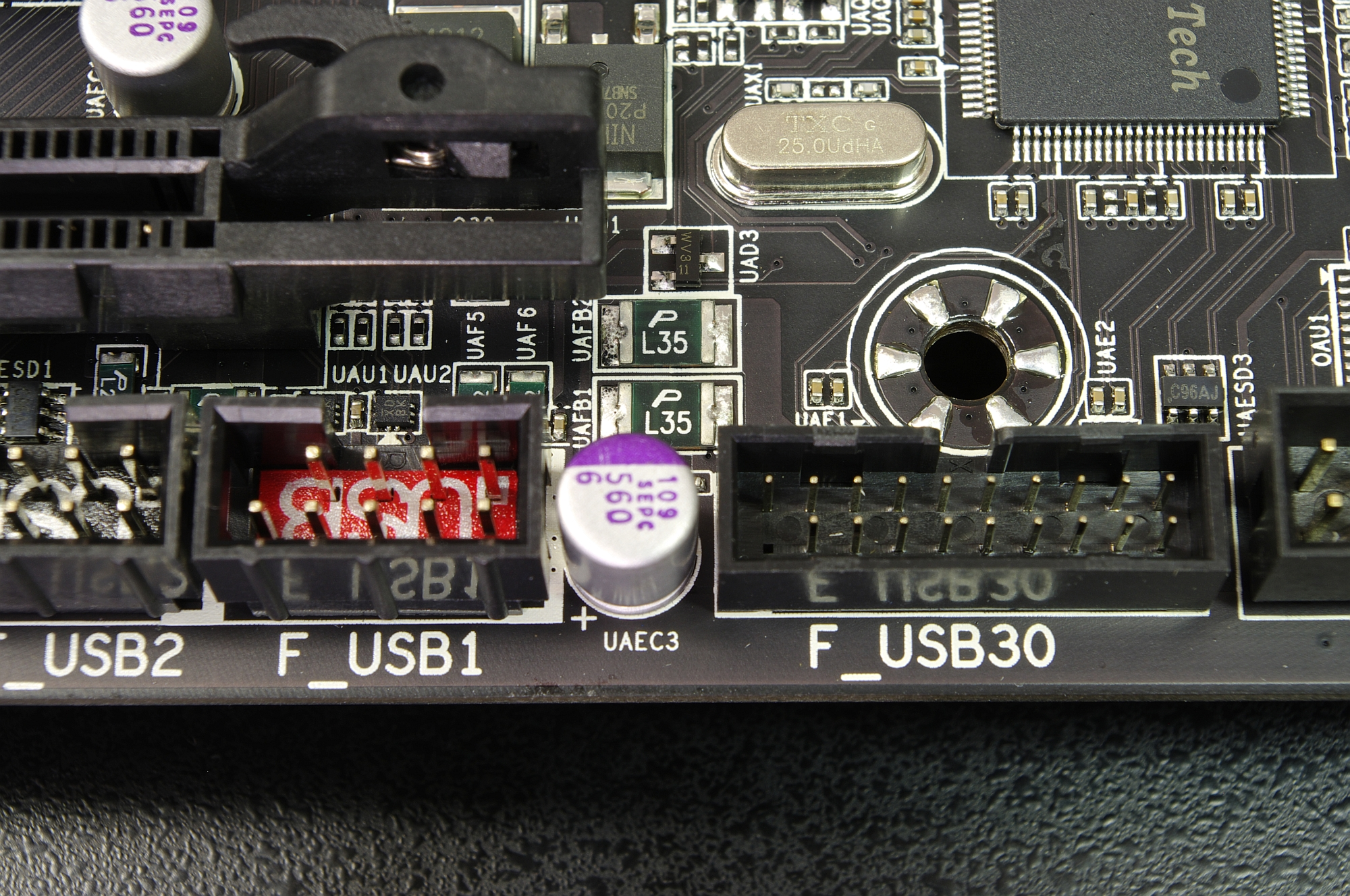
USB 9-pin and 19-pin headers

A computer's motherboard includes pin headers for connecting the motherboard to the USB ports on the computer case. The following types are standardized:

- 9-pin header for two USB 1.1/2.0 Type-A ports. There is also a 5-pin variant for a single port. Motherboards made before 2000 may have other layouts.
- 19-pin header for two USB 3.0 (also known as 3.1/3.2 Gen 1) Type-A ports. This is not backwards compatible with the 9-pin header; there is no standard for running a newer signal (e.g. Gen 2) over this header, but there is enough signal integrity to do so in practice.
- "Type-E" ports, which are not pin headers with an array of pins, but a port to plug into:
  - 20-pin Key-A for a single full-featured Type-C, providing up to 80 Gbps in the case of USB4 2.0. (As the original definition is for USB 3.1 Gen 2 [aka USB 3.2 Gen 2, ×2 for two lanes in USB-C], the electrical connection between the case-port and the header may not be of high enough quality for 80 Gbps. USB4 40 Gbps should be achievable as it requires the same cable quality as USB 3.1 Gen 2.) It can also be used to provide one Type-A port up to USB 3.1/3.2 Gen 2. There is officially no provision for providing two Type-A ports from this header as it only provides one pair of legacy (USB 1.1/2.0) data pins. The 20-pin headers are not backwards compatible with either 9 or 19-pin.
  - 20-pin Key-B for two Type-A ports up to USB 3.1/3.2 Gen 2. This header differs from Key-A by reassigning the CC and SBU pins to legacy 1.1/2.0 data (D+, D−) and power (VBUS, GND). Physical keying prevents mixing of Key-A and Key-B port (headers) and plugs.
  - 40-pin, which is functionally the same as two 20-pin Key-A headers put side-by-side. Supports either two Type-C ports, one Type-C plus one Type-A port, or two Type-A ports. A 40-pin port can accept a 20-pin Key-A plug.

All these systems are electrically compatible with each other like the USB external connectors are, so passive adapters can be used to mitigate physical incompatibilities, e.g. by converting 19-pin headers to 9-pin headers. It is even possible to convert a 19-pin header to a 20-pin header for USB-C use, albeit without CC and SBU functionality.

The shape and contact positions, i.e. footprints, for USB receptables soldered onto circuit boards (surface-mount devices) is partly standardized.

In addition, there is an embedded USB (eUSB2) specification describing using USB 2.0 for the communication between two chips on the same circuit board. It uses a lower signaling voltage compared to regular USB 2.0.

=== Proprietary connectors and formats ===
Manufacturers of personal electronic devices might not include a USB standard connector on their product for technical or marketing reasons. For example, Olympus has been using a special cable called CB-USB8, one end of which has a special contact. Some manufacturers provide proprietary cables, such as Apple with the Lightning cable, that permit their devices to physically connect to a USB standard port. Full functionality of proprietary ports and cables with USB standard ports is not assured; for example, some devices only use the USB connection for battery charging and do not implement any data transfer functions.

== Cabling ==
A USB twisted pair, in which the Data+ and Data− conductors are twisted together in a double helix. The wires are enclosed in a further layer of shielding.

The D± signals used by low, full, and high speed are carried over a twisted pair (typically unshielded) to reduce noise and crosstalk. SuperSpeed uses separate transmit and receive differential pairs, which additionally require shielding (typically, shielded twisted pair but twinax is also mentioned by the specification). Thus, to support SuperSpeed data transmission, cables contain twice as many wires and are larger in diameter.

The USB 1.1 standard specifies that a standard cable can have a maximum length of 5 metres (16 ft 5 in) with devices operating at full speed (12 Mbit/s), and a maximum length of 3 metres (9 ft 10 in) with devices operating at low speed (1.5 Mbit/s).

USB 2.0 provides for a maximum cable length of 5 metres (16 ft 5 in) for devices running at high speed (480 Mbit/s). The primary reason for this limit is the maximum allowed round-trip delay of about 1.5 μs. If USB host commands are unanswered by the USB device within the allowed time, the host considers the command lost. When adding USB device response time, delays from the maximum number of hubs added to the delays from connecting cables, the maximum acceptable delay per cable amounts to 26 ns. The USB 2.0 specification requires that cable delay be less than 5.2 ns/m (1.6 ns/ft, 192000 km/s), which is close to the maximum achievable transmission speed for standard copper wire.

The USB 3.0 compliance specifies a maximum length of 1 meter (3 ft 3 in) for cables that implement a micro-series plug, and 3 meters (9 ft 10 in) for cables that do not implement a micro-series plug.

== Power ==
Upstream USB connectors supply power at a nominal 5 V DC via the V_BUS pin to downstream USB devices.

=== Voltage tolerance and limits ===
Worst-case voltage drop topology of a USB 2.0 host to low-power device chain, at steady state

The tolerance on V_BUS at an upstream (or host) connector was originally ±5% (i.e. could lie anywhere in the range 4.75 V to 5.25 V). With the release of the USB Type-C specification in 2014 and its 3 A power capability, the USB-IF elected to increase the upper voltage limit to 5.5 V to combat voltage drop at higher currents. The USB 2.0 specification (and therefore implicitly also the USB 3.x specifications) was also updated to reflect this change at that time. A number of extensions to the USB Specifications have progressively further increased the maximum allowable V_BUS voltage: starting with 6.0 V with USB BC 1.2, to 21.5 V with USB PD 2.0 and 50.9 V with USB PD 3.1, while still maintaining backwards compatibility with USB 2.0 by requiring various forms of handshake before increasing the nominal voltage above 5 V.

USB PD continues the use of the bilateral 5% tolerance, with allowable voltages of PDO ±5% (e.g. for a PDO of 9.0 V, the minimum and maximum limits are 8.55 V and 9.45 V, respectively). Overshoot (or undershoot) not exceeding ±0.5 V is allowed for up to 275 milliseconds when changing to a higher (or lower) voltage.

There are several minimum allowable voltages defined at different locations within a chain of connectors, hubs, and cables between an upstream host (providing the power) and a downstream device (consuming the power). To allow for voltage drops, the voltage at the host port, hub port, and device are specified to be at least 4.75 V, 4.4 V, and 4.35 V respectively by USB 2.0 for low-power devices, (Note: Low-power devices are those which draw less than 1 unit load. 1 unit load is 100 mA for USB 2.0) but must be at least 4.75 V at all locations for high-power (Note: High-power devices in USB 2.0 are those that draw more than one unit load (up to a maximum of 5 unit loads). 1 unit load is 100 mA.) devices (however, high-power devices are required to operate as a low-powered device so that they may be detected and enumerated if connected to a low-power upstream port). The USB 3.x specifications require that all devices must operate down to 4.00 V at the device port.

Unlike USB 2.0 and USB 3.2, USB4 does not define its own VBUS-based power model. Power for USB4 operation is established and managed as defined in the USB Type-C Specification and the USB PD Specification.

Worst-case voltage drop topology of a USB 3.x host to device chain, at steady state. Under transient conditions the supply at the device can momentarily drop from 4.0 V to 3.67 V.

=== Allowable current draw ===
USB power standards
Specification	Current (max.)	Voltage	Power (max.)
Low-power device	100 mA	5 V	0.50 W
Low-power SuperSpeed (USB 3.0) device	150 mA	5 V	0.75 W
High-power device	500 mA (Note: Up to 5 unit loads; with non-SuperSpeed devices, one unit load is 100 mA.)	5 V	2.5 W
High-power SuperSpeed (USB 3.0) device	900 mA (Note: Up to 6 unit loads; with SuperSpeed devices, one unit load is 150 mA.)	5 V	4.5 W
Battery Charging (BC) 1.2	1.5 A	5 V	7.5 W
Single-lane SuperSpeed+ (USB 3.2 Gen 2×1) device	1.5 A (Note: Up to 6 unit loads; with multi-lane devices, one unit load is 250 mA.)	5 V	7.5 W
Power Delivery 3.0 SPR	3 A	5 V	15 W
Power Delivery 3.0 SPR	3 A	9 V	27 W
Power Delivery 3.0 SPR	3 A	15 V	45 W
Power Delivery 3.0 SPR	3 A	20 V	60 W
Power Delivery 3.0 SPR Type-C	5 A (Note: >3 A (>60 W) operation requires an electronically marked cable rated at 5 A.)	20 V	100 W
Power Delivery 3.1 EPR Type-C	5 A	28 V (Note: >20 V (>100 W) operation requires an electronically marked Extended Power Range (EPR) cable.)	140 W
Power Delivery 3.1 EPR Type-C	5 A	36 V	180 W
Power Delivery 3.1 EPR Type-C	5 A	48 V	240 W

The limit to device power draw is stated in terms of a unit load, which is 100 mA for USB 2.0, or 150 mA for SuperSpeed (i.e. USB 3.x) devices. Low-power devices may draw at most 1 unit load, and all devices must act as low-power devices before they are configured. A high-powered device must be configured, after which it may draw up to 5 unit loads (500 mA), or 6 unit loads (900 mA) for SuperSpeed devices, as specified in its configuration; the maximum power may not always be available from the upstream port.

A bus-powered hub is a high-power device providing low-power ports. It draws one unit load for itself and one unit load for each of at most four ports. The hub may also have some non-removable devices in place of ports, a common example being a keyboard with two low-power A ports included, sufficient for pointing devices such as mice. (Such a keyboard is, in USB terms, one hub and one peripheral device.) A self-powered hub is a device that provides high-power ports by supplementing the power supply from the host with its own external supply. Optionally, the hub controller may draw power for its operation as a low-power device, but all high-power ports must draw from the hub's self-power.

Where devices (for example, high-speed disk drives) require more power than a high-power device can draw, they function erratically, if at all, from bus power of a single port. USB provides for these devices as being self-powered. However, such devices may come with a Y-shaped cable that has two USB plugs (one for power and data, the other for only power), so as to draw power as two devices. Such a cable is non-standard, with the specification stating that "use of a 'Y' cable (a cable with two A-plugs) is prohibited on any USB peripheral", meaning that "if a USB peripheral requires more power than allowed by the USB specification to which it is designed, then it must be self-powered."

Since USB 2.0, overcurrent protection mechanisms for hosts and devices have been standardized.

=== USB battery charging ===
USB Battery Charging (BC) defines a charging port, which may be a charging downstream port (CDP), with data, or a dedicated charging port (DCP), without data. Dedicated charging ports can be found on USB power adapters to run and charge attached devices and charge battery packs. Charging ports on a host with both kinds will be labeled.

The charging device identifies a charging port by non-data signaling on the D+ and D− terminals. A dedicated charging port places a resistance not exceeding 200 Ω across the D+ and D− terminals.

Per the base specification, any device attached to a standard downstream port (SDP) must initially be a low-power device, with high-power mode contingent on later USB configuration by the host. Charging ports, however, can immediately supply between 0.5 and 1.5 A of current. The charging port must not apply current limiting below 0.5 A, and must not shut down below 1.5 A or before the voltage drops to 2 V.

Since these currents are larger than in the original standard, the extra voltage drop in the cable reduces noise margins, causing problems with High Speed signaling. Battery Charging Specification 1.1 specifies that charging devices must dynamically limit bus power current draw during High Speed signaling; 1.2 specifies that charging devices and ports must be designed to tolerate the higher ground voltage difference in High Speed signaling.

Revision 1.2 of the specification was released in 2010. It made several changes and increased limits, including allowing 1.5 A on charging downstream ports for unconfigured devices – allowing High Speed communication while having a current up to 1.5 A. Also, support was removed for charging-port detection via resistive mechanisms.

Before the Battery Charging Specification was defined, there was no standardized way for the portable device to inquire how much current was available. For example, Apple's iPod and iPhone chargers indicated the available current by voltages on the D− and D+ lines (sometimes also called "Apple Brick ID"): When D+ and D− were both 2.0 V, a device could pull up to 900 mA; When D− was instead 2.8 V, a device could pull up to 1 A; or else instead if D+ was 2.8 V, a device could pull up to 2 A.

==== Accessory Charger Adapter ====
A USB On-The-Go (OTG) device has a single Micro-AB port (or, formerly, a Mini-AB port) for charging as well as for connecting either to a host or to peripheral devices. An Accessory Charger Adapter (ACA) allows simultaneous connection to a charger and either to a host or to peripheral devices, with the charger providing power to both the OTG device and any connected peripheral devices. For example, a keyboard can connect to a smartphone, or a printer, a keyboard, and a flash drive can connect to a smartphone through a USB hub, with the ACA capable of charging the smartphone and powering the keyboard, flash drive, and hub; or the smartphone can connect to a computer (host) that does not provide full power for charging, while the ACA provides full charging power.

An Accessory Charger Adapter has three ports: OTG, Charger, and Accessory. The OTG port connects to the On-The-Go device through a permanently-attached (captive) cable with a (mechanically) Micro-A plug. The Charger port is visibly marked Charger Only and does not support USB communication with the OTG device. It is either a Micro-B receptacle or a captive cable; such a captive cable either has a Standard-A plug or is permanently attached to a charger. The Accessory port is either a Micro-AB or Standard-A receptacle. An A receptacle by definition can only connect to peripheral devices; the Micro-AB receptacle can be used to connect either a host or peripheral devices. The captive plug of the OTG port is unusual in that, unlike a normal Micro-A plug, which is not only mechanically identifiable as an A plug but also electrically marked as such (causing an OTG device to behave as a host), the Micro-A plug of the Accessory Charger Adapter electrically becomes B when a Micro-B plug is connected to the (Micro-AB) Accessory port, causing the OTG device to behave as a peripheral.

=== USB Power Delivery ===
The USB Type-C Charging logo (USB4 20 Gbps port)

USB PD Rev. 1.0 source profiles
Profile	+5 V	+12 V	+20 V
0	Reserved		
1	2.0 A, 10 W (Note: Default start-up profile)	—N/a	—N/a
2	2.0 A, 10 W	1.5 A, 18 W	—N/a
3	2.0 A, 10 W	3.0 A, 36 W	—N/a
4	2.0 A, 10 W	3.0 A, 36 W	3.0 A, 60 W
5	2.0 A, 10 W	5.0 A, 60 W	5.0 A, 100 W

USB Power Delivery rev. 2.0/3.x power rules
Power	Minimum USB‑C cable required	Voltage	Current
≤ 15 W	Any (Note: 60 W label required on both plug bodies by current standard, not required on older cables)	5 V	≤ 3.0 A
≤ 27 W	Any	9 V	≤ 3.0 A
≤ 45 W	Any	15 V	≤ 3.0 A
≤ 60 W	Any	20 V	≤ 3.0 A
≤ 100 W	5 A, or 100 W (Note: Electronically marked)	20 V	≤ 5.0 A
≤ 140 W (Note: USB PD Extended Power Range)	240 W (Note: 240 W label required on both plug bodies)	28 V	≤ 5.0 A
≤ 180 W	240 W	36 V	≤ 5.0 A
≤ 240 W	240 W	48 V	≤ 5.0 A

Power rule of USB Power Delivery Revision 3.1

In July 2012, the USB Promoters Group announced the finalization of the USB Power Delivery (USB PD) specification (USB PD rev. 1), an extension that specified using certified PD-aware legacy cables with USB Standard-A and Standard-B connectors to deliver increased power (more than the 7.5 W maximum allowed by the earlier USB Battery Charging specification) to devices with greater power demands. (USB PD Standard-A and Standard-B plugs have mechanical marks while Micro plugs have resistors or capacitors attached to the ID pins indicating the cable capability.) USB PD devices can request higher currents and supply voltages from compliant hosts – up to 2 A at 5 V (for a power consumption of up to 10 W), and optionally up to 3 A or 5 A at either 12 V (36 W or 60 W) or 20 V (60 W or 100 W). In all cases, both host-to-peripheral-device and peripheral-device-to-host configurations are supported.

The intent is to permit uniformly charging laptops, tablets, USB-powered disks and similarly higher-power consumer electronics, as a natural extension of existing European and Chinese mobile telephone charging standards. This may also affect the way electric power used for small devices is transmitted and used in both residential and public buildings. The standard is designed to coexist with the earlier USB Battery Charging specification.

The first Power Delivery specification (Rev. 1.0) defined five fixed power profiles for the power sources. PD-aware devices implement a flexible power management scheme by interfacing with the power source through a bidirectional data channel and requesting a certain level of electrical power, variable up to 5 A and 20 V depending on supported profile. The power configuration protocol can use BMC coding over the Configuration Channel (CC) wire, if one is present, or a 24 MHz BFSK-coded transmission channel on the V_{BUS} line.

The USB Power Delivery specification revision 2.0 (USB PD Rev. 2.0) was released as part of the USB 3.1 suite. It covers the USB-C cable and connector with a separate configuration channel, which now hosts a DC coupled low-frequency BMC-coded data channel that reduces the possibilities for RF interference. Power Delivery protocols were updated to use USB-C features such as the Type-C Cable ID function, Alternate Mode negotiation, increased V_{BUS} currents, and V_{CONN}-powered accessories.

As of revision 2.0, version 1.2, the five fixed power profiles for power sources have been deprecated. USB PD Power Rules replace power profiles, defining four normative voltage levels at 5, 9, 15, and 20 V. Instead of five fixed profiles, power supplies may support any maximum source output power from 0.5 W to 100 W.

The USB Power Delivery specification revision 3.0 defines an optional Programmable Power Supply (PPS) protocol that allows granular control over V_{BUS} output, allowing a voltage range of 3.3 to 21 V in 20 mV steps, and a current specified in 50 mA steps, to facilitate constant-voltage and constant-current charging. Revision 3.0 also adds extended configuration messages and fast role swap and deprecates the BFSK protocol. PPS can reduce heat generation of both charger and device.

The Certified USB Fast Charger logo, indicating support for the Programmable Power Supply (PPS) protocol in USB Power Delivery (PD) chargers

On January 8, 2018, USB-IF announced the Certified USB Fast Charger logo for chargers that use the Programmable Power Supply (PPS) protocol from the USB Power Delivery 3.0 specification.

In May 2021, the USB PD promoter group launched revision 3.1 of the specification. Revision 3.1 adds Extended Power Range (EPR) mode, which allows higher voltages of 28, 36, and 48 V, providing up to 240 W of power (48 V at 5 A), and the Adjustable Voltage Supply (AVS) protocol, which allows specifying the voltage from a range of 15 to 48 V in 100 mV steps. Higher voltages require electronically marked EPR cables that support 5 A operation and incorporate mechanical improvements required by the USB Type-C standard revision 2.1; existing power modes are retroactively renamed Standard Power Range (SPR). The AVS protocol is not backward compatible with the PPS protocol. A charger that supports AVS may not support PPS as well.

In October 2023, the USB PD promoter group launched revision 3.2 of the specification. The AVS protocol now works with the old standard power range (SPR), down to a minimum of 9 V.

Prior to Power Delivery, mobile phone vendors used custom protocols to exceed the 7.5 W cap on the USB Battery Charging Specification (BCS). For example, Qualcomm's Quick Charge 2.0 is able to deliver 18 W at a higher voltage, and VOOC delivers 20 W at the normal 5 V. Some of these technologies, such as Quick Charge 4, eventually became compatible with USB PD again.

=== Sleep-and-charge ports ===
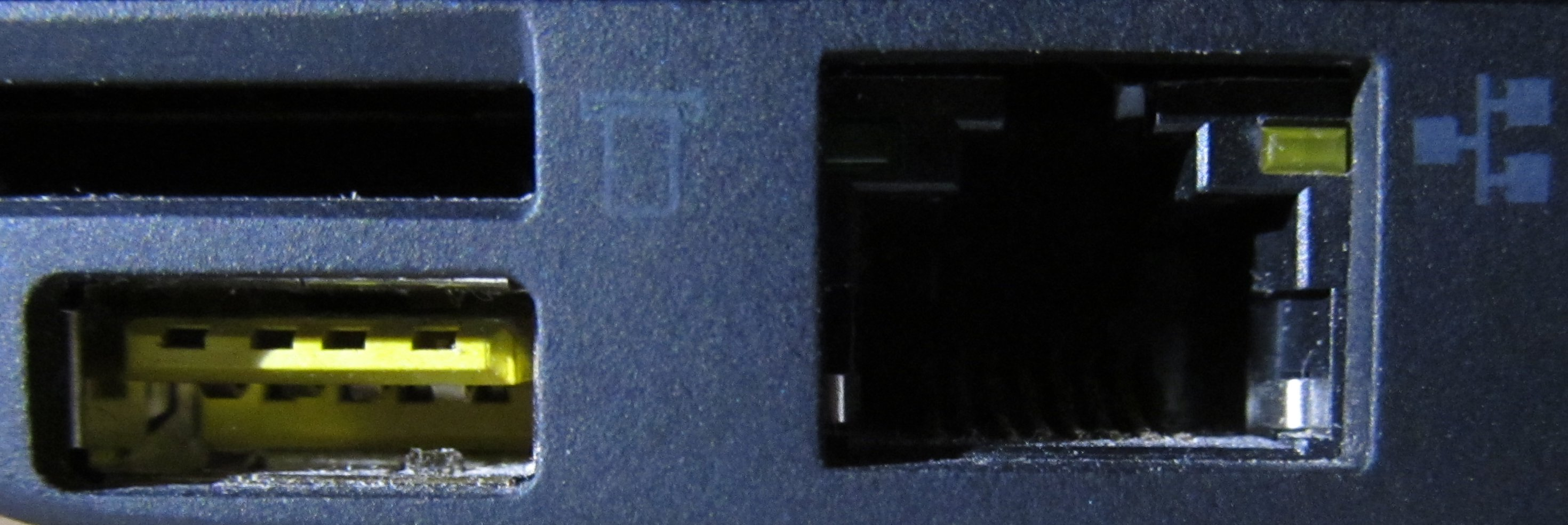
A yellow USB port denoting sleep-and-charge

Sleep-and-charge USB ports can be used to charge electronic devices even when the computer that hosts the ports is switched off. Normally, when a computer is powered off the USB ports are powered down. This feature has also been implemented on some laptop docking stations, allowing device charging even when no laptop is present. On laptops, charging devices from the USB port when it is not being powered from AC drains the laptop battery; most laptops have a facility to stop charging if their own battery charge level gets too low.

On Dell, HP and Toshiba laptops, sleep-and-charge USB ports are marked with the standard USB symbol with an added lightning bolt or battery icon on the right side. Dell calls this feature PowerShare, and it needs to be enabled in the BIOS. Toshiba calls it USB Sleep-and-Charge. On Acer Inc. and Packard Bell laptops, sleep-and-charge USB ports are marked with a non-standard symbol (the letters USB over a drawing of a battery); the feature is called Power-off USB. Lenovo calls this feature Always On USB.

=== Mobile device charger standards ===
==== In China ====
Starting in 2007, all new mobile phones applying for a license in China are required to use a USB port as a power port for battery charging. This was the first standard to use the convention of shorting D+ and D− in the charger.

==== OMTP/GSMA Universal Charging Solution ====
In September 2007, the Open Mobile Terminal Platform group (a forum of mobile network operators and manufacturers such as Nokia, Samsung, Motorola, Sony Ericsson, and LG) announced that its members had agreed on Micro-USB as the future common connector for mobile devices.

The GSM Association (GSMA) followed suit on February 17, 2009, and on April 22, 2009, this was further endorsed by the CTIA – The Wireless Association, with the International Telecommunication Union (ITU) announcing on October 22, 2009, that it had also embraced the Universal Charging Solution as its "energy-efficient one-charger-fits-all new mobile phone solution", and added: "Based on the Micro-USB interface, UCS chargers will also include a four-star or higher efficiency rating – up to three times more energy-efficient than an unrated charger."

==== EU smartphone power supply standard ====
In June 2009, the European Commission organized a voluntary Memorandum of Understanding (MoU) to adopt micro-USB as a common standard for charging smartphones marketed in the European Union. The specification was called the common external power supply. The MoU lasted until 2014. The common EPS specification (EN 62684:2010) references the USB Battery Charging Specification and is similar to the GSMA/OMTP and Chinese charging solutions. In January 2011, the International Electrotechnical Commission (IEC) released its version of the (EU's) common EPS standard as IEC 62684:2011.

In 2022, the Radio Equipment Directive 2022/2380 made USB-C compulsory as a mobile phone charging standard from 2024, and for laptops from 2026.

==== EU external power supply regulation ====
In December 2028, EU regulation 2025/2052 will require that all external power supplies, not only those used to charge portable devices, must have USB-C receptacles. This applies to all external power supplies performing AC-to-DC conversion and providing total power up to 100 W.

=== Proprietary standards ===
A variety of proprietary (non-USB) standards support charging devices faster than the USB Battery Charging standard. When a device doesn't recognize the faster-charging standard, generally the device and the charger fall back to the USB battery-charging standard of 5 V at 1.5 A (7.5 W). When a device detects it is plugged into a charger with a compatible faster-charging standard, the device pulls more current or the device tells the charger to increase the voltage or both to increase power (the details vary between standards).

Such standards include:

- Apple "Brick ID" 2 A and 2.4 A charging (described above, does not use BC negotiation)
- Huawei SuperCharge
- MediaTek Pump Express
- Motorola TurboPower
- Oppo Super VOOC Flash Charge, are also known as Dash Charge or Warp Charge on OnePlus devices and Dart Charge on Realme devices
- Qualcomm Quick Charge (QC)
- Samsung Adaptive Fast Charging

=== Non-standard devices ===
Some USB devices require more power than is permitted by the specifications for a single port. This is common for external hard and optical disc drives, and generally for devices with motors or lamps. Such devices can use an external power supply, which is allowed by the standard, or use a dual-input USB cable, one input of which is for power and data transfer, the other solely for power, which makes the device a non-standard USB device. Some USB ports and external hubs can, in practice, supply more power to USB devices than required by the specification but a standard-compliant device may not depend on this.

In addition to limiting the total average power used by the device, the USB specification limits the inrush current (i.e., the current used to charge decoupling and filter capacitors) when the device is first connected. Otherwise, connecting a device could cause problems with the host's internal power. USB devices are also required to automatically enter ultra low-power suspend mode when the USB host is suspended. Nevertheless, many USB host interfaces do not cut off the power supply to USB devices when they are suspended.

Some non-standard devices use the USB 5 V power supply without participating in a proper USB network, which negotiates power draw with the host interface; these devices typically violate the standards by drawing more power than is allowed without negotiation. Examples include USB-powered keyboard lights, fans, mug coolers and heaters, battery chargers, miniature vacuum cleaners, and even miniature lava lamps. In most cases, these items contain no digital circuitry, and thus are not standard-compliant USB devices. This may cause problems with some computers, such as drawing too much current and damaging circuitry. Prior to the USB Battery Charging Specification, the USB specification required that devices connect in a low-power mode (100 mA maximum) and communicate their current requirements to the host, which then permits the device to switch into high-power mode.

Some devices predating USB Power Delivery, when plugged into charging ports, draw even more power (10 watts) than the Battery Charging Specification allows, using proprietary methods but without violating USB standards, maintaining full compatibility – the iPad is one such device; it negotiates the current pull with data pin voltages. Barnes & Noble Nook Color devices also require a special charger that can provide 1.9 A.

=== PoweredUSB ===
PoweredUSB is a proprietary extension, from long before USB Power Delivery, that adds four pins supplying up to 6 A at 5 V, 12 V, or 24 V. It is commonly used in point-of-sale systems to power peripherals such as barcode readers, credit card terminals, and printers.

== See also ==
- USB-to-serial adapter
- USB communications
