= Anderson Powerpole =

Family of electrical connectors

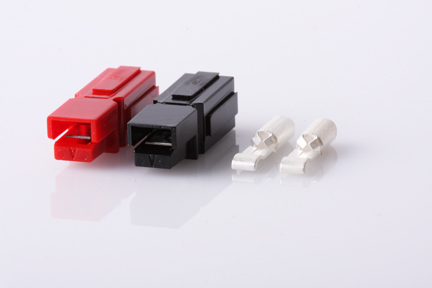
- Anderson Powerpole 15/30/45 ampere housings and contacts (front view)
- Component type: Electrical connector

The Anderson Powerpole is a family of electrical connectors by Anderson Power Products (APP), although plug compatible connectors are now available from alternate sources. Specific variants of this series of connectors have become de facto standards for conveying "higher power" direct current (DC) electrical power, although these standards are inconsistent and sometimes ignored.

== Overview ==
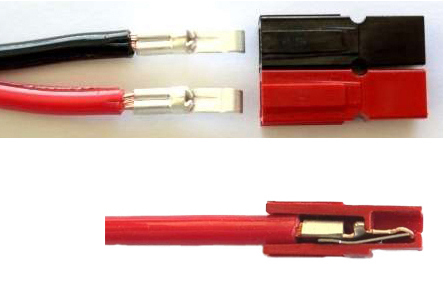
Cutaway view of housing (side view)

Powerpole connectors are hermaphroditic, with "cis" connectivity (pin 1 on one connector mates with pin 1 on the other connector, and pin 2 with pin 2), thus avoiding the need to worry about which end is the plug and which the socket, or which end has the correct polarity. This is in contrast to the two-wire trailer plug, which has "trans" connectivity (pin 1 on each connector mates with pin 2 on the other).

Powerpole connectors are available with current ratings of up to 180 amperes. The 15/30/45 ampere-rated connectors are the most common, using the same plastic housing and differing only in the metal contact inserted into the housing. The contact is selected based on the ampacity and wire gauge. The colors can be used to signify signal types (power, speaker, logic, microphone audio, etc.) or differing voltages. Powerpole connectors can be attached side to side and also stacked on top of each other to make, for example, four connections with one plug insertion. The contacts are rated for 100,000 no-load insertions and 250 hot-plugs at full load.

Larger Powerpole connectors (the SB/Multipole series) with two or three contacts in one molded housing are commonly used in various industrial settings, including as a battery connection for some uninterruptible power supplies (UPSs), removable vehicle winches, many electric forklifts, and other electric vehicles. They range from 50 to 500 amps, 600 volts.

=== Competitors ===
Some of Anderson's earlier patents have expired, thus other manufacturers have released plug-compatible connectors, such as "AMP Power Series" by Tyco / TE Connectivity, Sermos, and Lightspeed.

=== Patents ===
The Powerpole connector was designed and patented by "Albert & J M Anderson Mfg Comp", then more recently by "Anderson Power Products".

Anderson company patents
Patent Number	Patent Year	Filing Year	Patent Title	Notes
US2838739 A	1958	1953	Electrical connector	Earlier related concepts
US3091746 A	1963	1960	Electrical connector	
US3259870 A	1966	1963	Electrical connector	Primary powerpole patent
US7153152 B1	2006	1997	Electrical connector with planar contact engaging surface	PP75 connector
WO2004051681 A2	2004	2003	Finger proof, keyed power connector and methods thereof	
WO2005059969 A2	2005	2004	A wire to board connector and methods thereof	
USD604246 S1	2009	2008	Electrical connector	

=== Color coded multipole series ===
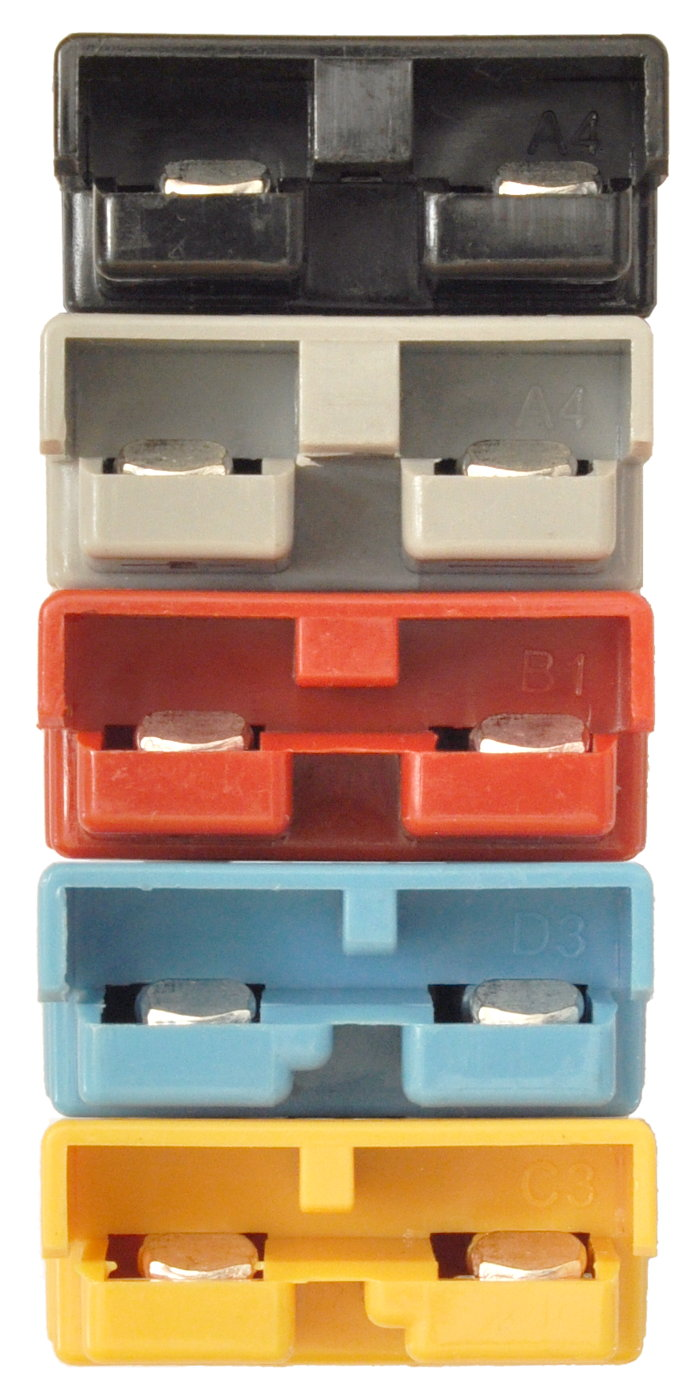
Different keying for each colour in the SB50 series. Note that black and grey are keyed the same making them interchangeable.

For the larger multipole design, which is available in up to 700 A sizes, each color is physically keyed so as to mate only with a like colored connector, and Anderson published a list of recommended voltage for each color:

Anderson Powerpole color code chart
Color	Suggested voltage	Alternate non-Anderson-suggested uses
Yellow	12 V	Some APC brand 24 V internal UPS battery packs.
Orange	18 V	
Red	24 V	Wide use in the Amateur radio community at +12 V DC (13.8 V DC) for emergency power and mobile radio use.; Used by Warn brand of automotive winches at +12 V DC (13.8 V) power to the winch motor.; Sometimes used by outdoor enthusiasts for +12 V DC (13.8 V) battery charging, especially with photovoltaic panels.; Some model railroads at +12 V DC.; Some robots, such as FIRST Robotics Competition and the MATE ROV Competition.; Some Tripp Lite brand 24 V DC external UPS battery packs.
Gray	36 V	Some +12 V DC (13.8 V) automotive use in Australia, such as caravan and camper battery charging, pumps, solar power systems.; Frequently used by outdoor enthusiasts for 12 V DC (13.8 V DC) battery systems.; Some APC brand 24 V DC internal and external UPS battery packs.; Some Tripp Lite brand 38 V DC external UPS battery packs.; Some Lees brand 36 V DC forklift traction battery connections.
Blue	48 V	Some APC and Tripp Lite brand 48 V DC external UPS battery packs.; +9 V DC in some audio equipment.
Green	72 V	Green is the worldwide color for the frame ground, safety or "earth" / "earthing" ground.
Black	80 V	Ground for amateur radio, automotive/RV/caravan, winches, model railroads, robotics.
Brown	96 V	
Purple	120 V	−48 V DC in some telecommunications equipment.
White	144 V	+5 V DC in some computer equipment.

- Model railroad uses all of the above colors for various purposes.

== De facto standards ==
=== Amateur astronomy ===
Many companies in the amateur astronomy space have adopted Powerpole connectors, as a large number of astronomical devices use 12-volts, and Powerpole connectors offer a low cost and easy solution to make adaptors, extensions, and distribution panels.

=== Amateur radio ===
The Powerpole connector has been adopted by many segments of the Amateur Radio (Ham Radio) community as their standard 12-volt DC power connector for everything from radios to DC power sources to accessories. Three notable groups are the Amateur Radio Emergency Service (ARES), the Radio Amateur Civil Emergency Service (RACES) and the Wireless Institute Civil Emergency Network (WICEN). Standardization allows equipment owned by different hams to be used together without needing adapters in emergencies, at public service events, at field day, during contests, when borrowing equipment, etc.

The Anderson Powerpole connector is more expensive than the older de facto standards of the two-wire trailer plug and the Molex connector, but provides a more reliable electrical connection (both mechanically and electrically), and is easier to adapt to a wider range of wire gauges. Another advantage over the older trailer or Molex connectors is the Powerpole's superior ratings to withstand 100,000 no-load insertions and 250 hot-plugs at full load. The specific hermaphroditic nature of the powerpoles is a significant advantage since batteries can be both a power source or a power sink, a power supply can be connected to a radio and/or a battery, and multiple batteries, radios, and/or redundant power sources can be connected in parallel using the same power distribution panels. Connectors in which non-hermaphroditic contacts are arranged in a hermaphroditic arrangement (such as bullet connectors used in low end solar equipment) can be electrically incompatible (reverse polarity damages equipment) and non-hermaphroditic connectors can be mechanically incompatible with each other (won't mate).

Many pieces of amateur radio equipment run on 12-volt DC automotive voltage, which is also called 13.8-volt DC. The voltage delivered by a lead–acid battery with six-cells used as an automotive battery will vary depending on various electrical loads in a vehicle. Without loads the battery will float from 11.7 to 12.8 volts, and while charging from an alternator the voltage will increase to 13.8–14.4 volts DC.

For use in amateur radio, the community has adopted a standard color code, polarity, and specific physical arrangement for assembling pairs of Powerpole connectors. One red and one black powerpole housing can be physically arranged in 4 topologically different mechanical orientations (red left, red right, red top, red bottom—when viewed from contact side with tongue up), 2 of which are mechanically incompatible (connectors won't mate with ARES) and 1 is electrically incompatible (will mate but reverse polarity) with the ARES standard; there are also additional unusual configurations in which one housing is rotated 90 degrees. The standard is red positive and black negative. When viewed from the contact side, a mnemonic for remembering the arrangement is: "Red [on] Right — Tongue [on] Top" (note the first letter alliteration).

West Mountain Radio, a major amateur radio supplier, has had a few 24 V DC products in their catalog for over a decade. They incorporate a 24 volt standard that has the orange body as +24 volts. An orange and black pair would be +24 volts on the orange and ground on the black.

=== Model railways ===
In model railways, the NTRAK Modular Railroading Society adopted the Powerpole PP30 connector as a recommend practice in 2005. and as a standard in 2011. The use of the older Cinch-Jones connector has been deprecated, but is still permitted on legacy modules. However, the owner of a module with Cinch-Jones plugs is now required to provide adapter cables to the newer standard. North Raleigh Model Railroad Club (NRMRC) also uses Anderson Powerpole connectors. The Free-mo modular standard adopted Powerpole as the new connector standard as of 1 July 2015, with a one-year transition period to convert existing Jones connectors.

=== Robotics ===
The connectors are used by some robot builders, including the FIRST Robotics Competition, MATE ROV Competition, and R2-D2 Builders Club.

=== Radio control ===
The Powerpole connectors are used by radio control (R/C) model hobbyist clubs. They may be known as "SB" connectors or "Sermos" connectors with the suppliers in that community.

=== Data centers ===
Some buildings including data centers are increasingly designed for 380 V DC electric power distribution, as a way of improving electrical efficiency. DC power distribution has resulted in the need to standardize a Low Voltage (LV) connector with an integral ground conductor, which is safe for use by untrained personnel. The tendency of DC connectors to spark when disconnected from an inductive load requires the connector's insulating housing to contain the plasma arc, in addition to normal requirements such as preventing accidental finger contact. Examples of such connectors are the Anderson Powerpole Pak connectors and the SDG (Saf-D-Grid) connector, designed with the form factor of an IEC C13 connector.

== See also ==
- DC connector
- Electrical connector
- MC4 connector
- AMASS connector
- Microinverter
- Solar panel
- Tamiya connector
