= Martin Klein (engineer) =

American engineer

- Education: Bachelor of science Massachusetts Institute of Technology
- Known for: Side scan sonar technology

Martin Klein (born April 5, 1941) is an American engineer and inventor. He worked in the development of the side-scan sonar, a tool used in maritime archaeology, deep-sea and coastal survey, marine geology, offshore engineering and military mine defense.

== Life and education ==
Klein was born in New York City and lives in Andover, Massachusetts. He moved to Boston in 1958 for his education and graduated from the Massachusetts Institute of Technology (MIT) in 1962 with a bachelor’s degree in electrical engineering.

Klein’s career started as a student at MIT when he worked on projects with Harold “Doc” Edgerton in his Strobe Alley lab. After graduation, he joined Edgerton, Germeshausen & Grier (EG&G Inc.) in 1962 as program manager. Klein equipped the submersibles Trieste and Trieste II with the EG&G side scan sonar systems required in searching for the USS nuclear submarine Thresher that sank in 1963. During his time at EG&G, Klein also led the development of the Mark I dual channel, towed side scan sonar. Klein founded Klein Associates (now Klein Marine Systems) in 1968, a company that developed commercial sonar systems. He sold the company in 1989 but continues to work in ocean technologies. He is on the Advisory Boards of MIT Sea Grant, MIT Museum, and the Stellwagen Bank National Marine Sanctuary, a fellow of the Marine Technology Society and the Explorers Club, and an active part of the MATE ROV Competition community.

Klein received the Arnold O. Beckman award in 2011 for his contributions to technological development of the side scan sonar. He received an honorary doctoral degree from the University of New Hampshire for his contributions in scientific exploration such as research regarding the Loch Ness monster, helping to locate the RMS Titanic shipwreck, and pinpointing the Challenger space shuttle.
