= Car accessory socket =

Car accessory socket may refer to:

- Cigarette lighter receptacle
- ISO 4165
