= Cigarette lighter =

Cigarette lighter may refer to:

- Lighter, a portable device used to create a flame, that can be used to ignite a cigarette
- Automobile auxiliary power outlet, also known as car cigarette lighter
