= Tamiya connector =

Type of DC power connector

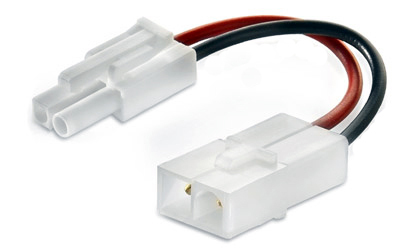
Tamiya connector

A Tamiya connector is a type of DC power connector, commonly used on radio-controlled model vehicle battery packs, drones and chargers. They are also commonly used on airsoft guns. The connector was designed by Japanese manufacturer Tamiya Corporation.

The connector is still available from connector manufacturers such as Molex. The following connectors are compatible with the Tamiya connectors: 19-09-1029 with crimp 02-09-1119 and 19-09-2029 with crimp 02-09-2116.

== Wiring ==
The usual wiring has the positive (red) wire running to the terminal with a square profile, and the negative (black) wire running to the half-circle, half-square terminal. This is true for both genders of connector. The female sockets are in a male housing and the male pins are in a female housing. The male pins (female housing) connector is usually on the battery side.

In electrical and electronics engineering, the convention is that gender refers to the metal contact parts of a connector in order to avoid ambiguity. A large number of hobbyist retailers selling these connectors refer to the gender of the plastic housing, which is against convention and can lead to errors.

In some cases, Mini-Tamiya connectors are wired in reverse polarity. This is often the case with airsoft guns, where the square profile terminal is the negative terminal and the rounded terminal is the positive terminal.

== Sizes ==
There are two sizes of Tamiya connectors: mini and standard.

The mini-Tamiya connector:

- uses one square and one or two round sheaths.
- outside dimensions is 9.9mm x 5.4mm x 22mm (about 3/8" x 7/32" x 7/8")

The standard Tamiya connector:

- uses "D" cross-section sheaths for polarisation
- outside dimensions of the standard connector is 13.4mm x 7.2mm x 26.8mm

== Advantages ==
A useful feature of the Tamiya connectors is the locking mechanism which prevents accidental disconnection.

The connector physically isolates the positive and negative wires so that the connectors remain safe to use in damp conditions. This makes them safe for use in relatively low-current applications (up to about 15 A) in dirty conditions (for example, model boats or RC cars used outdoors). The connector is rated to 160 volt, 20 amps. Maximum in real world is 12 volt, 15 amps.

== See also ==
- DC connector
- Electrical connector
- Anderson Powerpole
- Molex connector
