= Friedrich Wilhelm Schindler =

Swiss Austrian electrical engineer

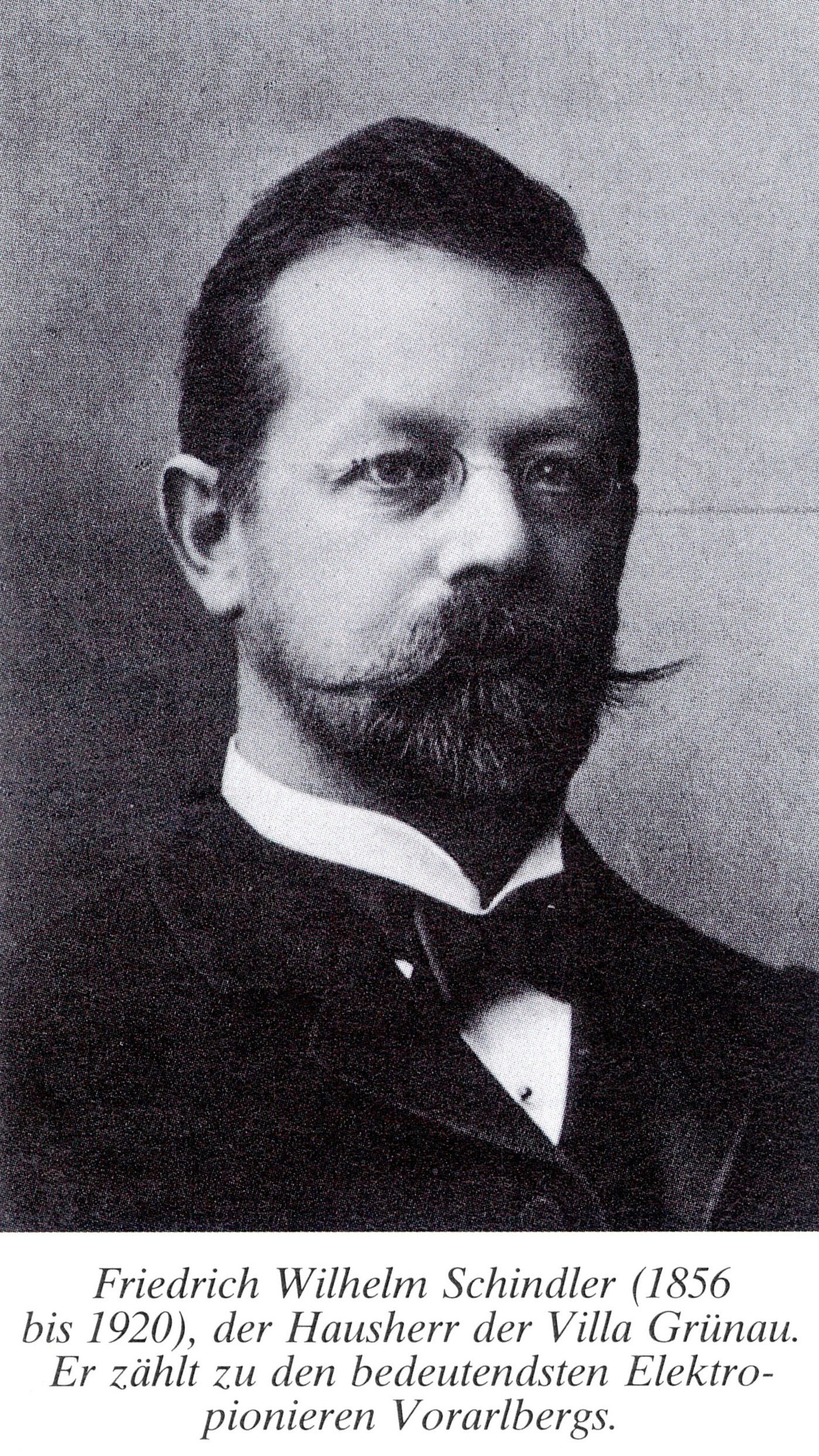
Portrait

Friedrich Wilhelm Schindler (June 1, 1856 – November 19, 1920) was a Swiss-Austrian pioneer of electrical engineering. He is notable for building Austria's first electric generator, introducing a fully electric kitchen at the 1893 Chicago World Fair, and patenting an early form of the electronic cigarette lighter.
