= DC connector =

Electrical connector for carrying DC power

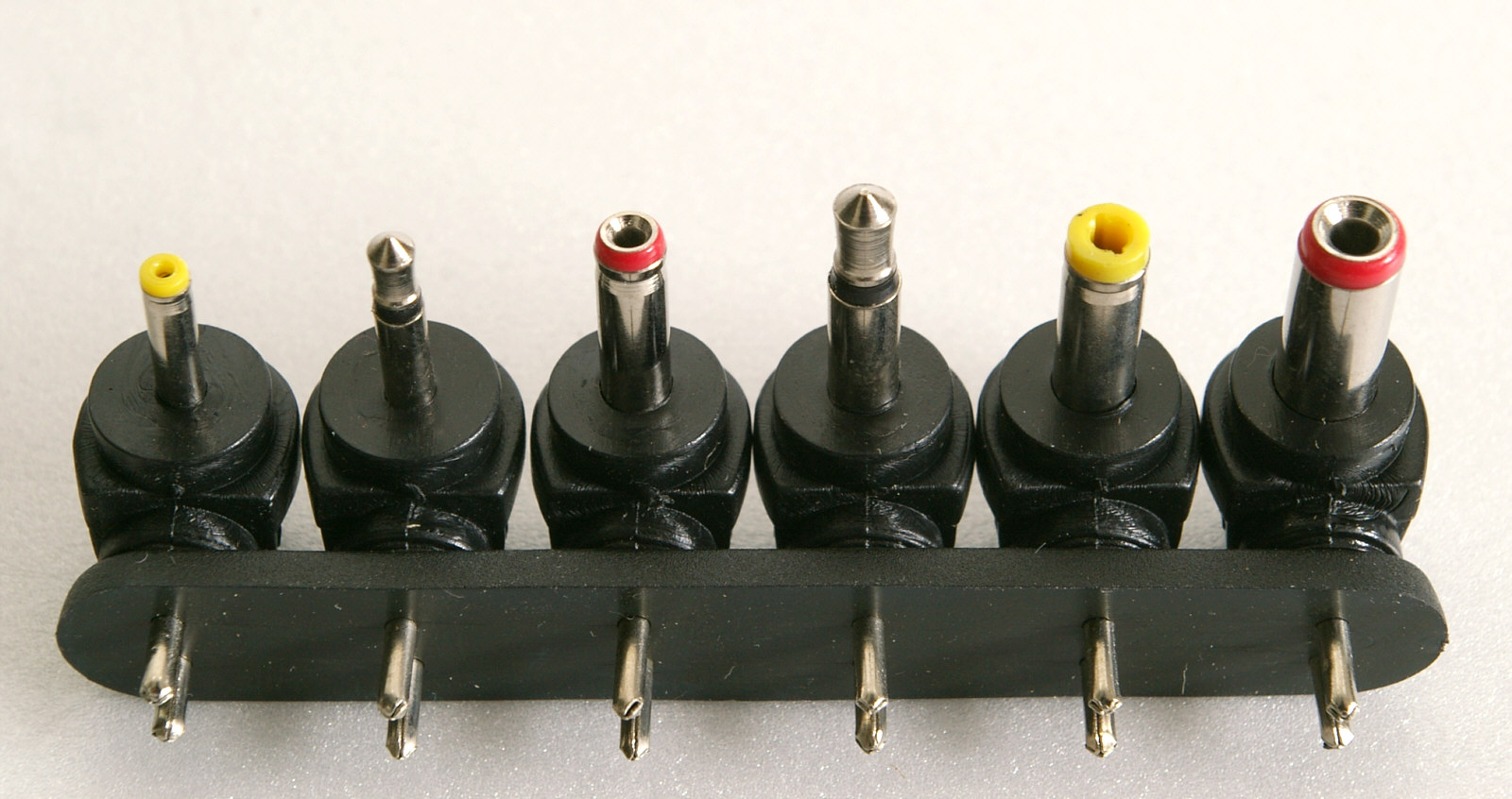
Some common coaxial DC power connectors

A DC connector (or DC plug, for one common type) is an electrical connector that supplies direct current (DC) power.

Compared to domestic AC power plugs and sockets, DC connectors have many more standard types that are not interchangeable. The dimensions and arrangement of DC connectors can be chosen to prevent accidental interconnection of incompatible sources and loads. Types vary from small coaxial connectors used to power portable electronic devices from AC adapters to connectors used for automotive accessories and for battery packs in portable equipment.

== Extra-low voltage (under 120 VDC) ==
These extra-low voltage connectors are rated at or below 120 VDC.

=== Cylindrical connectors ===
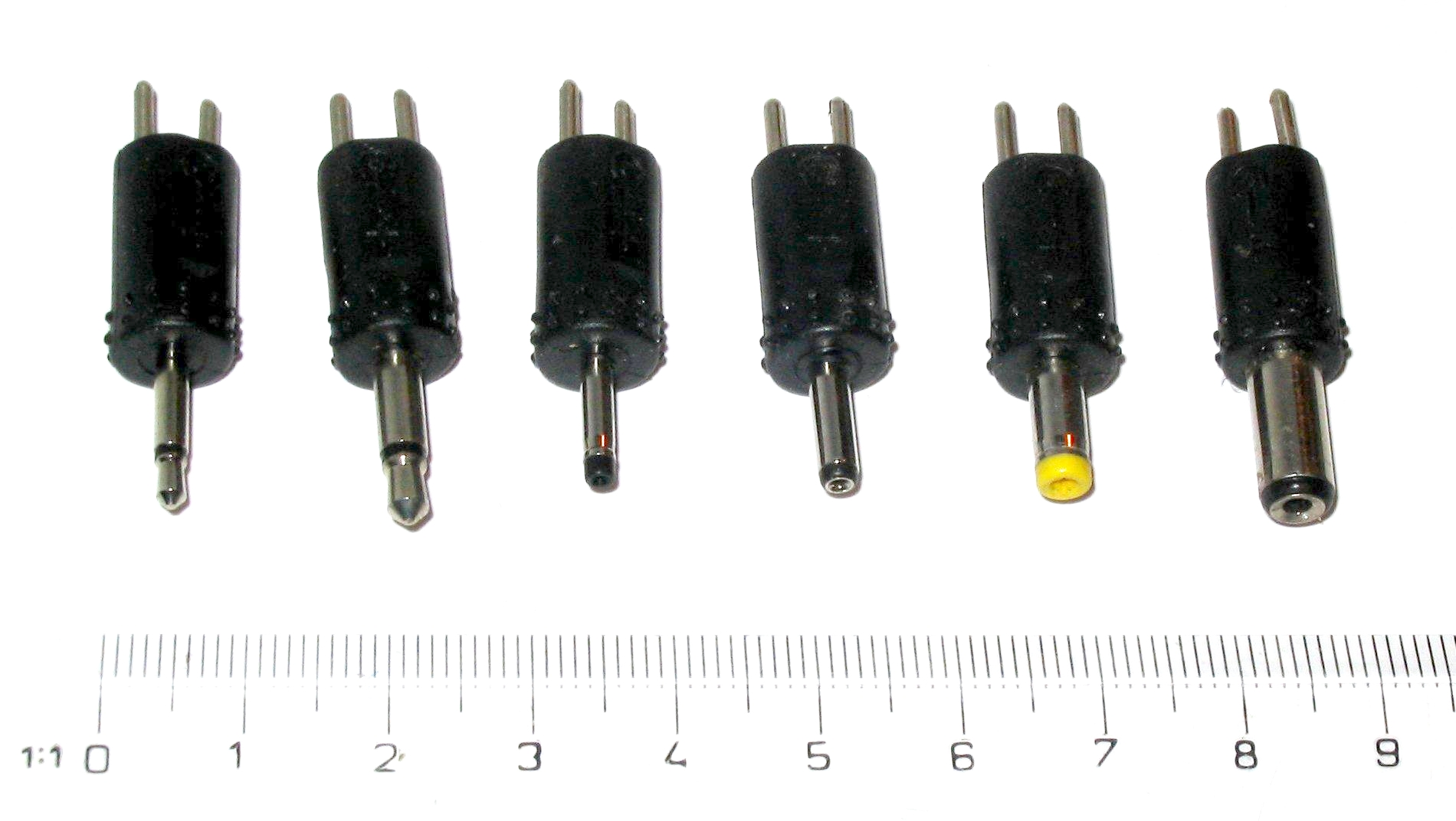
Common male DC power connectors (shown with a ruler marked in cm/mm)

Small cylindrical connectors come in various sizes. They may be known as "coaxial power connectors," "barrel connectors," "concentric barrel connectors," or "tip connectors."

These plugs are intended for use on the cable connected to an external AC adapter (power supply). The matching jack or socket is permanently fitted to power the equipment. Some of these jacks contain a normally closed contact, which can be used to disconnect internal batteries whenever the power supply is connected, avoiding the risk of battery leakage or explosion posed by incorrect battery recharging.

Cylindrical plugs usually have an insulated tip constructed to accept the insertion of a pin. The outer body of the plug is one contact, most often but not always the negative side of the supply. Inverted polarity plugs can and do damage circuitry when plugged in, even if the voltage is correct; not all equipment is equipped with protection. A pin mounted in the socket makes contact with a second internal contact. The outer plug contact is often called the barrel, sleeve, or ring, while the inner is called the tip.

There are a wide variety of sizes and designs for these power connectors, and many appear pretty similar to each other yet are not quite mechanically or electrically compatible. In addition to many generic designs (whose original designer is unknown), there are at least two national standards—EIAJ in Japan and DIN in Germany, plus the JSBP connector used on some laptop computers. The Japanese EIAJ standard includes five sizes, each supporting a specified range of voltages. However, most other coaxial DC power connectors have no specified voltage association. Generic plugs are often named for the pin diameter they are designed to take.

Many non-proprietary co-axial power plugs are 5.5 mm (0.22 in) in outside diameter (OD) and 9.5 mm (0.37 in) in length. Two pin sizes are standard in the jacks for this size plug body, 2.1 mm (0.083 in) and 2.5 mm (0.098 in), and the plugs should match. If the size is not known, it is difficult to distinguish by eye or measurement between the 2.1mm and 2.5mm ID plugs; some suppliers suggest simple methods.

Maximum current ratings commonly vary from unspecified up to 5 A (11 A for unique high-power versions from some companies), with 1 A, 2 A, and 5 A being common values. The smaller types usually have lower ratings, both for current and voltage. The 'tip' (i.e., the inner conductor) usually carries the positive (+) pole, but some devices and their power supplies use the negative tip. The connector size does not usually indicate the voltage. It is not possible, except for some proprietary connectors, to reliably infer any information on power parameters (current, voltage, polarity, even whether AC or DC) by examining the connector.

=== Snap and lock DC power connectors ===
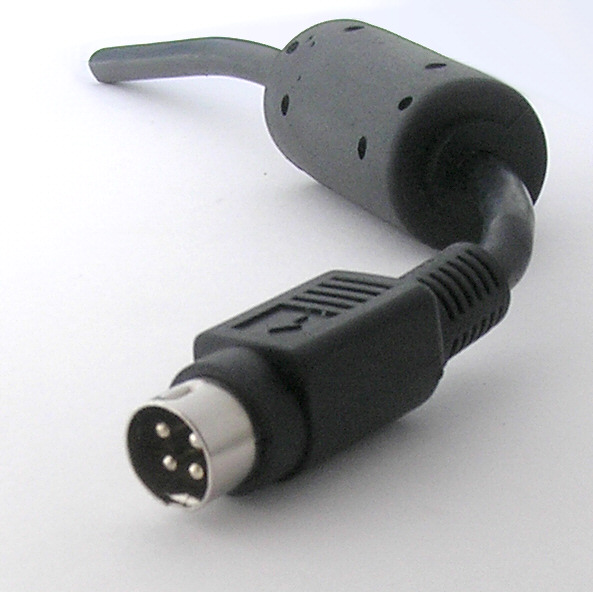
A male 4-pin "Kycon" power connector, which appears similar to a Mini-DIN connector

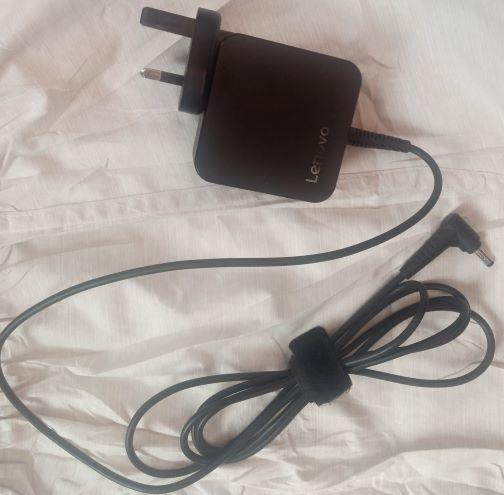
Right-angle DC connector

Snap and lock DC power connectors look similar to Mini-DIN connectors but have either 3 or 4 thicker pins and a slightly larger mating shell. Because of this, they do not mate with any of the standardized Mini-DIN connectors. Some devices, however, use a proper 4-pin Mini-DIN connector for power instead, presenting the possibility of mating such a connector with the wrong port (such as an S-Video output).

- Known as Kycon 3-pin and 4-pin DC power plugs.
- Erroneously also known as "Power DIN", although different from any standardized Mini-DIN or DIN connector type.
- The male plug's mating shell outer diameter is 10 mm (0.39 in), and the pins are 1.5 mm (0.059 in) diameter
- Standard may include a limit of 20 V at 7.5 amperes
- Locking variants have a knurled retaining ring on the male plug which allows fastening the plug to the chassis receiving the power.

=== Molex connector ===
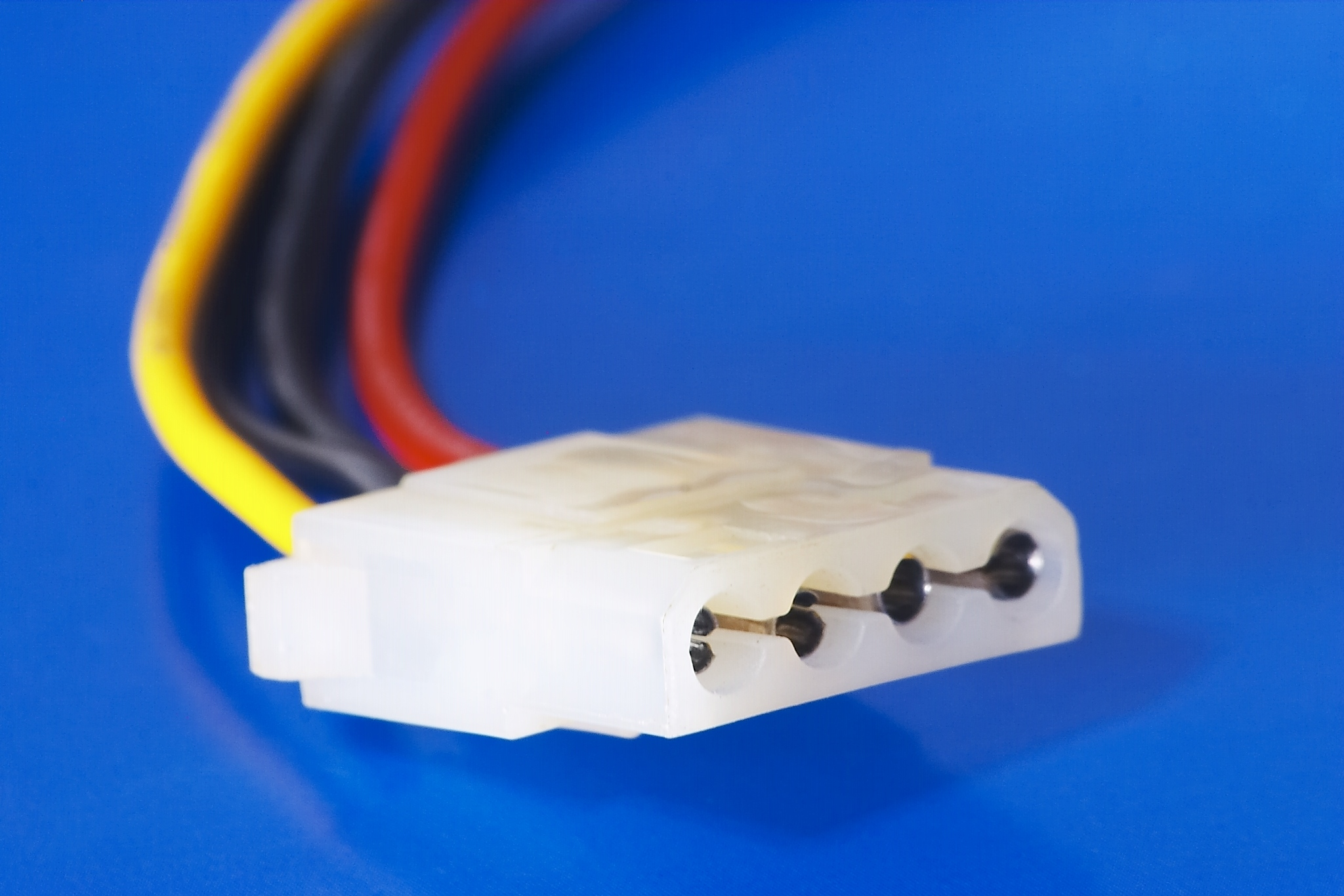
A Molex connector

Molex connectors were frequently used as DC power connectors in personal computers, for floppy, hard disk, and CD drives. These connectors have four pins, +5 V (red), 2 common ground (black), and +12 V (yellow). SATA peripherals use a different style of connector.

Locking Molex connectors are available in 3, 4, and 6 terminal configurations.

=== XT connectors ===
Solder cup terminals are primarily designed for the in-line solder termination of conductors. This style of terminal is principally designed as a precision-machined pin for insertion into connector bodies.

=== IEC 60906-3:1994 ===
The International Electrotechnical Commission (IEC) has produced a standard for a system of 2-pin plugs and socket-outlets for household and similar purposes in fixed and portable applications, either indoors or outdoors. Safety extra-low voltage (SELV) plugs and socket-outlets carry up to 16 amperes, and have eight keying possibilities, to indicate 6, 12, 24, or 48 volts, AC or DC.

The connector is circular, with the male connector having two pins placed symmetrically inside a circular shield, and the female connector having two receptacles surrounded by a circular groove to accept the male shield, in turn surrounded by a second circular shield which projects 6 mm (0.24 in) past the mating surface and encloses the male connector. (It somewhat resembles a smaller IEC 60309 connector.)

The dimensions are as follows:

Parameter	Value
Pin-to-pin distance	7.0 ± 0.1 mm (0.276 ± 0.004 in)
Pin diameter	3.5+0.000 −0.075 mm (0.140+0.000 −0.003 in)
Pin length	9.5 mm (0.374 in) (ref)
Female pin receptacle	4.0 ± 0.1 mm (0.157 ± 0.004 in)
Female body diameter	15.6 ± 0.15 mm (0.614 ± 0.006 in)
Female groove depth	10.0 ± 0.2 mm (0.394 ± 0.008 in)
Male shield inner diameter	16.0+0.2 −0.1 mm (0.630+0.008 −0.004 in)
Male shield length	10.0+0.5 −0.0 mm (0.394+0.020 −0.000 in)
Male pin tip to shield tip	0.5 ± 0.2 mm (0.020 ± 0.008 in)
Male shield outer diameter	19.0 ± 0.1 mm (0.748 ± 0.004 in)
Female shield inner diameter	19.4 ± 0.2 mm (0.764 ± 0.008 in)
Female shield length	16.0 ± 0.2 mm (0.630 ± 0.008 in)

The male shield has two keys projecting inwards, which fit into notches in the female body. The larger key is at right angles to the pins, 2.0 ± 0.1 mm (0.079 ± 0.004 in) wide and ending at a radius of 4.9 ± 0.1 mm (0.193 ± 0.004 in) from the connector centre. The corresponding notch is 2.3 ± 0.1 mm (0.091 ± 0.004 in) wide and ends at a radius of 4.6 ± 0.1 mm (0.181 ± 0.004 in) from the connector centre.

The angle of the second key from the first indicates the voltage and current type. The eight permitted angles are multiples of 30° which are not multiples of 90°. Angles of ±30° and ±60° indicate alternating current (50 or 60 Hz), while angles of ±120° or ±150° indicate direct current with the pin at 90° being negative and the pin at 270° being positive.

The second key is smaller than the first, 1.5 ± 0.1 mm (0.059 ± 0.004 in) wide ending at a radius of 6.4 ± 0.1 mm (0.252 ± 0.004 in) from the connector centre. The corresponding notch in the female connector body is 1.8 ± 0.1 mm (0.071 ± 0.004 in) wide and ends at a radius of 6.2 ± 0.1 mm (0.244 ± 0.004 in) from the connector centre.

With the angles measured clockwise looking at the female connector (counter-clockwise looking at the male), the various key positions indicate:

Angle	Supply
30°	6 V AC
60°	12 V AC
120°	6 V DC
150°	12 V DC
210°	24 V DC
240°	48 V DC
300°	24 V AC
330°	48 V AC

=== IEC 61076 (ELV) ===
M12 L-coding, 2-4 pins, 64 Vdc 12/16 A

M12 T-coding, 2-4 pins, 60 Vdc 12 A

The International Electrotechnical Commission (IEC) has standardized a set of multi-pin screw plugs matching ISO metric screw thread, available in M5, M8 and M12 sizes. M5 connectors are very low current, typically only used for signal wiring, while some M8 pin arrangements are rated for up to 3 A, and some M12 arrangements are available up to 16 A. The multi-pin design caters for Ethernet, single and three-phase AC, as well as single or multiple voltage DC. The DC ratings are typically 60 V and below, however the F-coding is rated for 300 V (see #IEC 61076 (LV) below).

=== Tamiya connectors ===
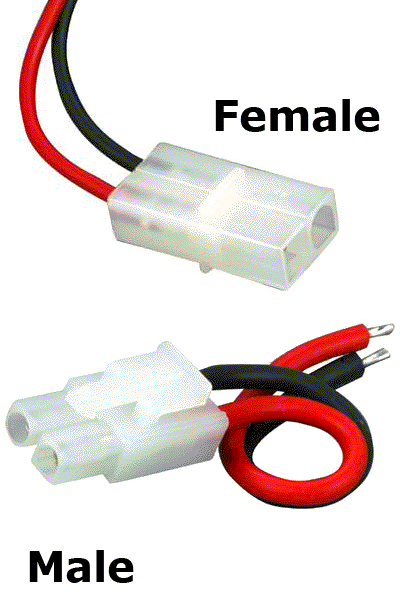
A Tamiya connector

Tamiya connectors are commonly used on radio control (toy) vehicle battery packs and chargers.

=== JST RCY connector ===
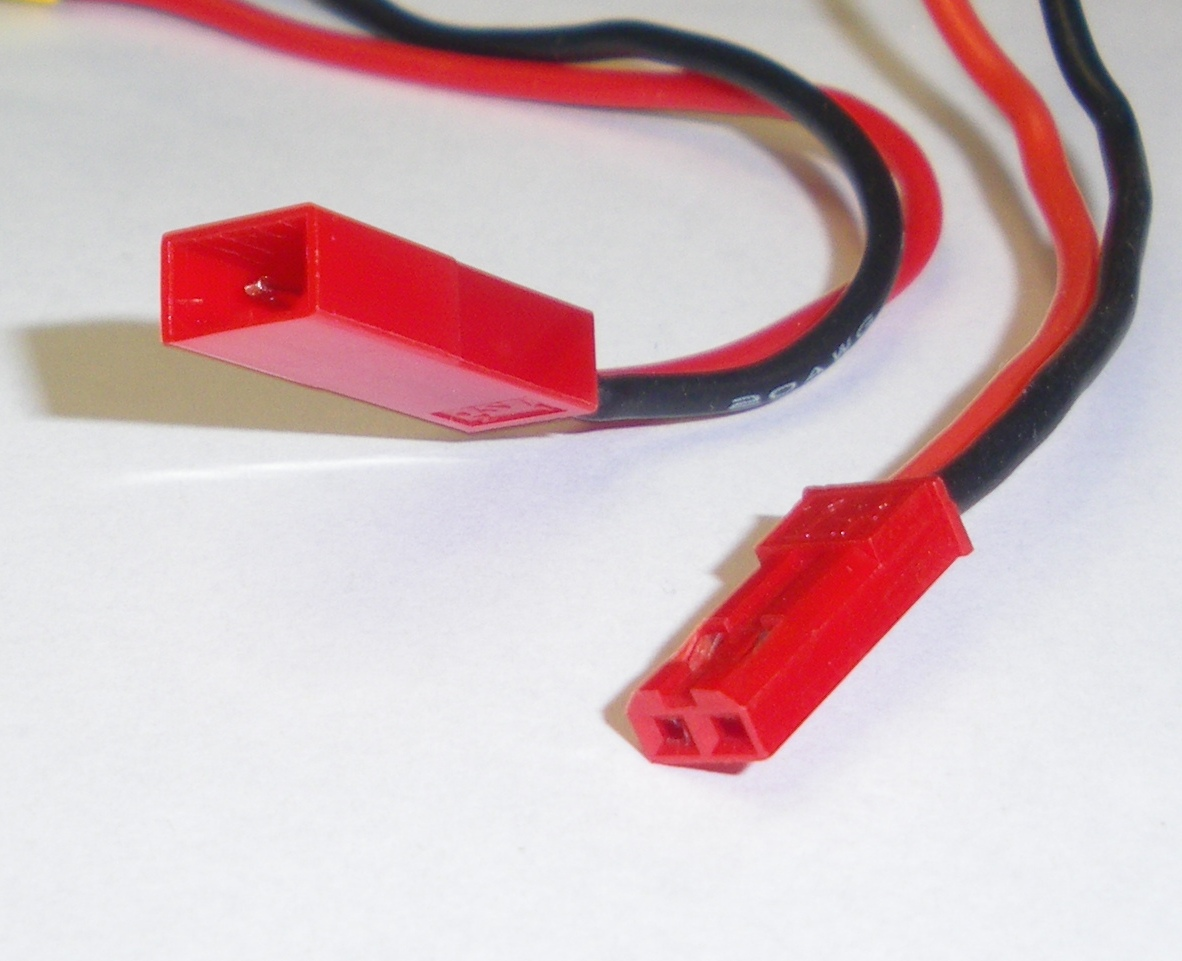
JST RCY connectors

The JST RCY-series connector is a 2.5mm-pitch and manufactured by J.S.T. Mfg. Co., Ltd. It is known in radio control circles as the battery eliminator circuit (BEC) or P connector. JST also produces other types of connectors that are used in R/C and hobby electronics.

=== Deans style T-Plug ===
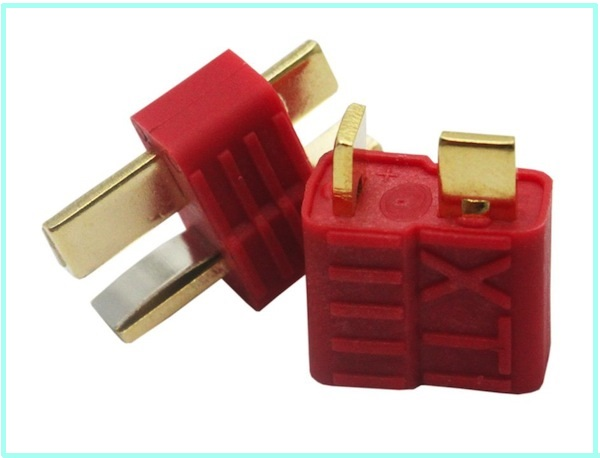
Deans style T-Plug

The Deans style T-Plug connector is a polarized high power plug that inhibits accidental reversed connections. This also applies in particular to avoid the LiPo flash, which can cause burn injuries or related damage. Depending on the make, Deans plugs are sensitive to overheating during soldering, as the plastic can become soft and the plug surfaces can easily twist. Depending on the construction, they can support currents up to 40 A (pulse to 70 A).

Usual pin assignment T-Plug: negative (-) is the parallel pin; positive (+) is the perpendicular pin.

=== Inverter tabs/lugs ===
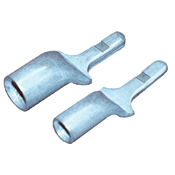
Inverter lugs

Inverter tabs/lugs are available in 2, 4, and 8 AWG. These are designed to pass very high currents at voltages up to 600 V DC to and from battery packs, inverters, and other high-current loads to a terminal bus.

=== Airline in-seat power supply system ===
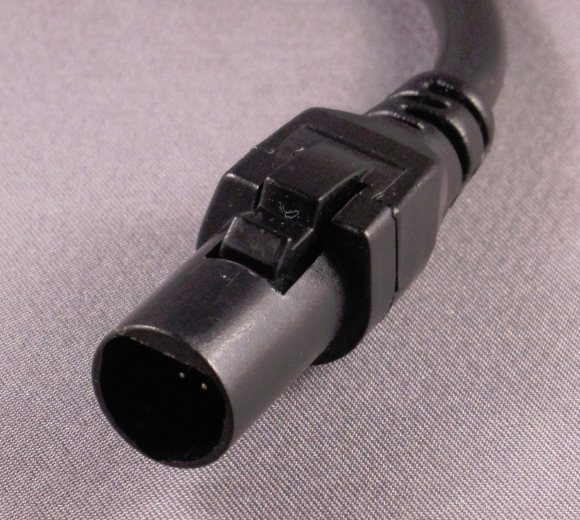
An EmPower plug

Two different airline in-seat power supply system (ISPSS) standards for DC power have been used in the past. American Airlines in the past used an automobile auxiliary power outlet. Most other airlines that provide DC power use the smaller EmPower system, which has a 4-pin Hypertronics' D-series connector. It can supply 15 volts maximum 5 amperes.

=== Anderson Powerpole connectors ===
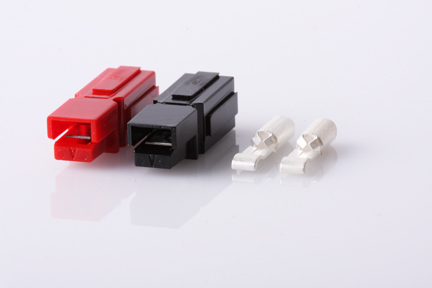
An Anderson Powerpole

Powerpole connectors are a series developed by Anderson Power Products[10] and available in a variety of sizes and colors. The commonly used 15/30/45 series connectors are interoperable and use the same housings but different contacts for different wire sizes and current requirements.

Powerpole connectors are physically and electrically genderless, thus avoiding the need to worry about which end is the plug and which the socket, or which end has the correct polarity, as is the case with the physically but not electrically genderless two-wire trailer plug.

Powerpoles have been adopted as a standard 12 V_{DC} connector by most RACES Radio Amateur Civil Emergency Service organizations and ARES Amateur Radio Emergency Service units. They deliver good current capability for their sizes and facilitate very easy pluggability for those without good eyesight or good lighting. However, they can be damaged relatively quickly and, if not correctly crimped, can occasionally separate from each other easily with minimal force unless additional retaining measures are taken.

=== SAE connector ===
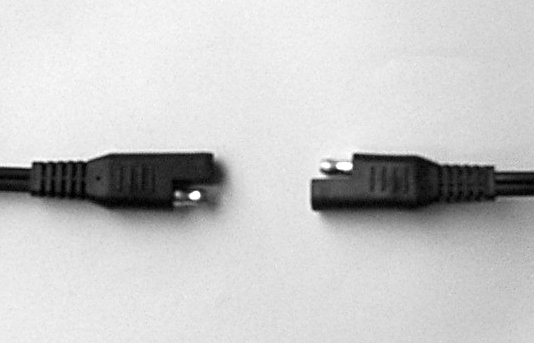
An SAE connector

The SAE connector is a physically self-mating hermaphrodite two-conductor DC connector commonly used for solar and automotive applications (including motorcycles). It is so named for the Society of Automotive Engineers which created the specifications this connector is based on.

Although the plug is physically hermaphroditic, and any SAE connector can be connected to any other SAE connector, they are NOT electrically hermaphroditic, and care needs to be taken to maintain correct polarity when connecting different plugs.

This connector typically applies a maintenance charge to a vehicle battery. When installed in a vehicle and attached to a battery, the polarity of the connector is always such that no short circuit will occur if the exposed terminal touches the vehicle chassis. In most vehicles, this means that the exposed terminal connects to the battery's negative terminal. Conversely, the positive terminal on a battery charger is exposed to mate with the concealed one on the vehicle side. (This is reversed on vehicles with a positive-ground frame, such as vintage British motorcycles.)

Although there is a risk of short-circuiting a battery charger, the risk is minimal and often mitigated by the circuitry of the battery charger itself. On the other hand, the short-circuit current of the lead–acid batteries installed in vehicles is sufficiently great that a short circuit could result in a fire or explosion. The priority is therefore given to avoiding short circuits of the vehicle battery rather than the charger.

Although the term "SAE connector" is commonly used to refer to the pictured two-pin connector, many different connector standards are designated by SAE International which may also be referred to by this term. Furthermore, while the design of the subject connector was inspired by and based on SAE Standards, the connector itself has no official SAE designation.

Upon researching, we found that there is no specification addressing the SAE 2 Pin overmold connector. SAE (Society of Automotive Engineers) Specification J928 addresses “Electrical Terminals – Pin and Receptacle Type” and SAE J1239 addresses 4, 5, and 8 pin trailer connectors, but there doesn’t seem to be an SAE specification for the 2 pin overmold configuration.

Seems the 2 pin overmold configuration was sort of a spin off developed in the early ’80’s using the spacing from the SAE 4 pin connector addressed by SAE J1239. So, technically speaking, the 2 pin configuration is not governed by any SAE standard, but they were developed to be compliant with SAE J928 and J1239.

Certainly, the SAE perspective was toward automotive applications, including: trailer hitch/lighting wiring, onboard mechanisms (such as power windows), and battery maintenance.

— https://web.archive.org/web/20190701114324/http://sae2pin.com/tag/j928/ Retrieved May 21, 2020

The SAE Specifications are available for J928 and J1239 but do require payment to be viewed.

=== Car lighter sockets and plugs ===
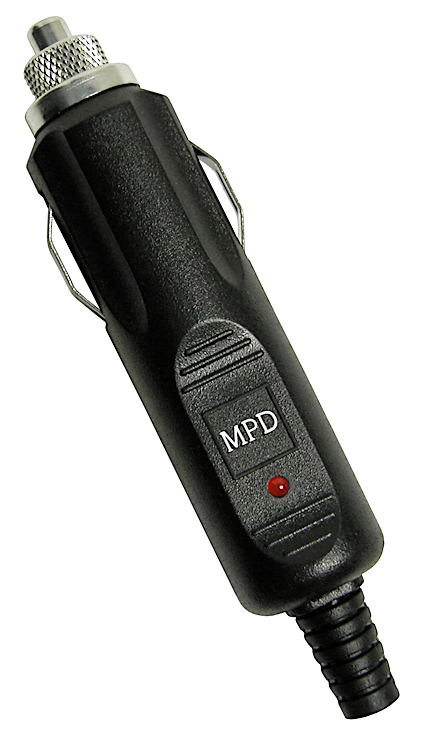
A 12–Volt cigar lighter plug

The automobile auxiliary power outlet is also called a cigarette lighter receptacle, or cigar lighter receptacle, since it was originally designed as a lighter for cigars—hence its rather large size. Nowadays, it is used to power automotive accessories such as portable inverters, mobile phone chargers and portable refrigerators.

These sockets were not originally designed to provide DC power, and are not an ideal DC connector for several reasons, but still widely used for compatibility to existing accessories. Three sizes exist, one for 6 V_{DC} and two for 12 V_{DC} and the mating of the different sized 12 V_{DC} plugs and jacks is problematic. Because of this, and the small gauge wire sometimes used, they may provide unreliable power connections.

The polarity for 12 V_{DC} sockets is center pin positive (+), outer collar negative (−). Reversed polarity will damage some electronic devices.

Although the nominal voltage of a 12 V lead acid battery is 12 V_{DC}, when the engine is running the car's battery charging system will bring the system voltage to 13.8 V_{DC} or higher. The possible range of battery voltages from 11–15 V_{DC} must be taken into account by devices attached to the cigar lighter socket.

This connector is also often used for powering accessories on motorcycles, such as heated clothing (vests, gloves, etc.) or GPS units. This makes "plugging in" easier to manage while wearing gloves. As the accessory lacks any power of its own, there's no risk of "shorting" the exposed connector.

=== ISO 4165 connector ===
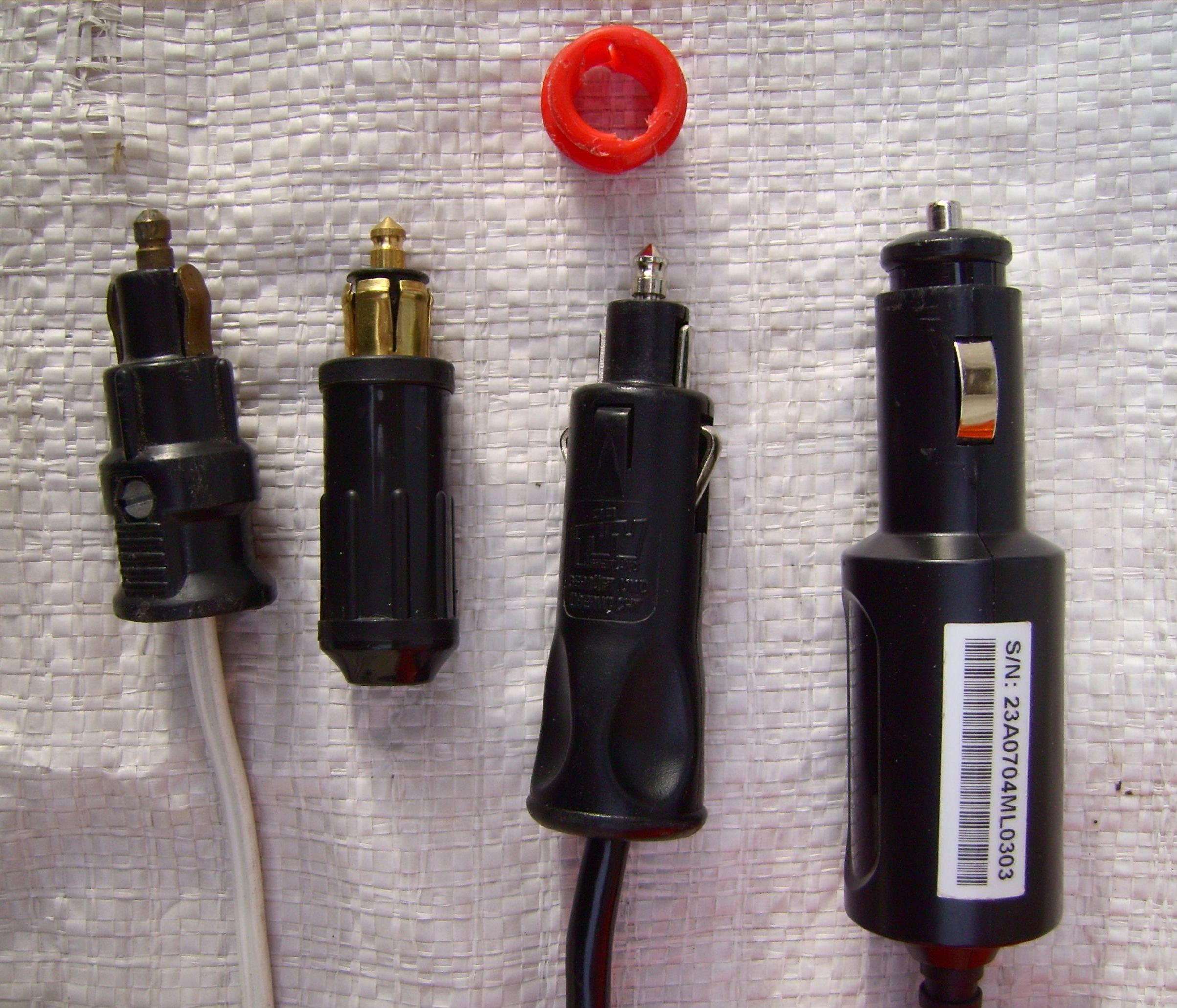
ISO 4165

Similar in concept to an automotive cigar lighter, the ISO 4165 connector is shorter and smaller.

Found most frequently on motorcycles, it is also known as a "BMW Accessory", "Hella", "Merit", "Norm" or "Powerlet" connector.

=== XLR connectors used for power ===
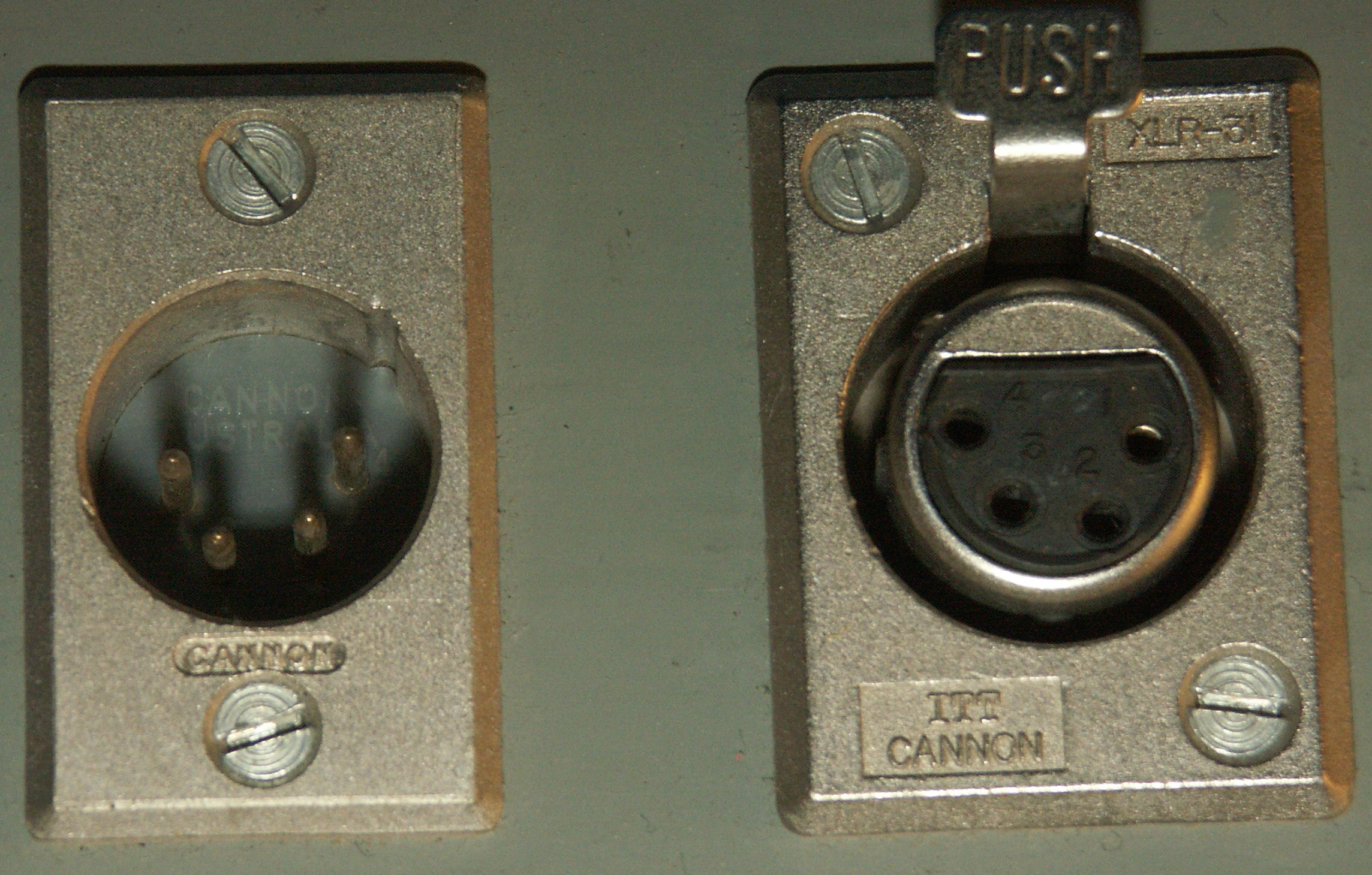
XLR4

In the broadcast, film, and television industries, the 4-pin XLR connector is the standard for 12 V power. The connectors are wired pin 1 negative, pin 4 positive. Often pins 1 and 2 will be negative, 3 and 4 positive for a higher current rating. Female connectors are used as supply and male connectors are used on loads. Most battery belts and power supplies output 13.2 V, but equipment can usually handle a range of 11–18 volts to accommodate battery packs of varying voltages and charging while operating.

The readily available XLR3 is also used by some manufacturers as power supply plugs despite their being a well-accepted standard for other purposes.

=== Clipsal connectors ===
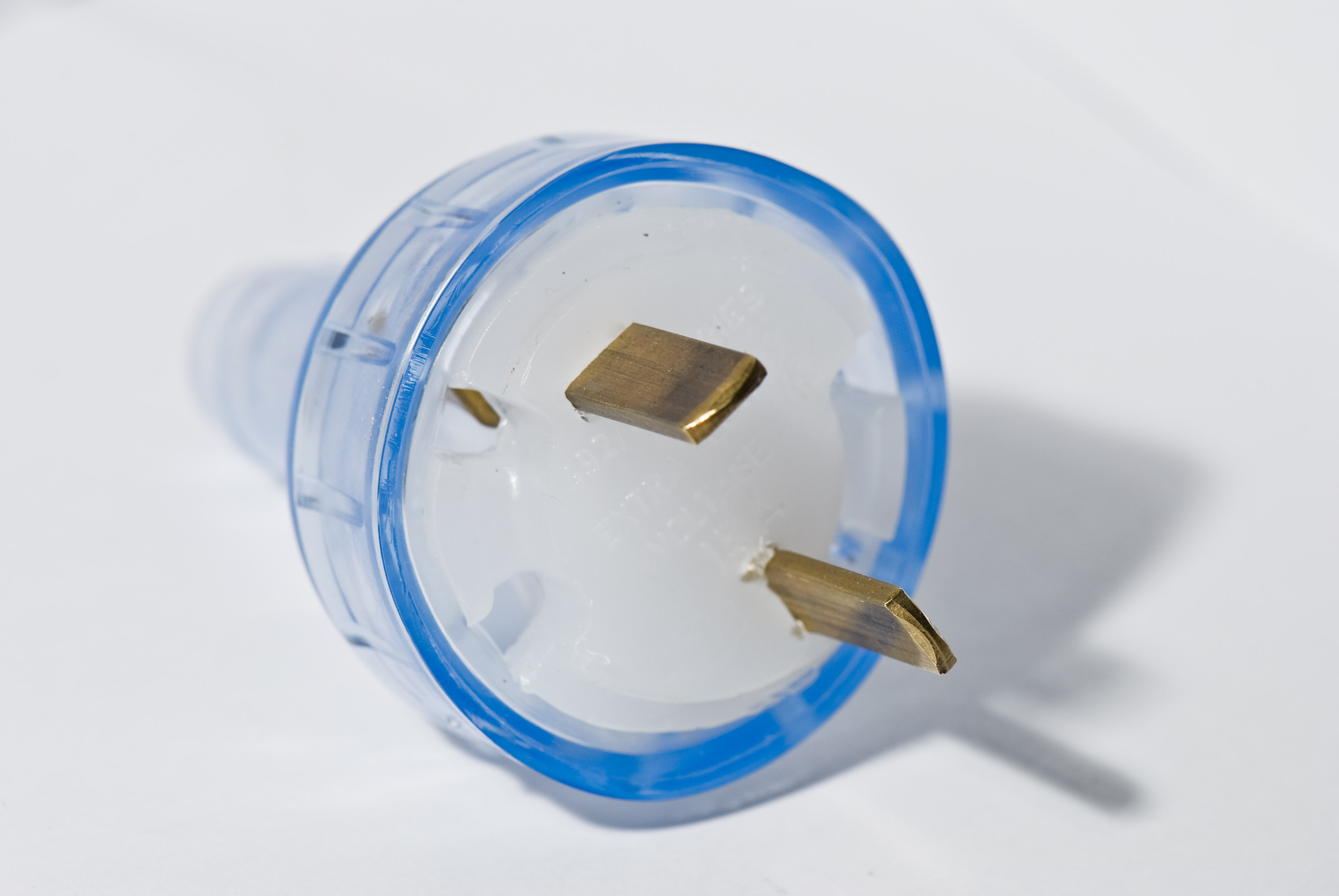
Clipsal 492/32 DC plug, not wired

In Australia, a T-configuration Clipsal socket is used for extra-low voltage DC power outlets, such as in stand-alone power systems (SAPS) or on boats, in order to prevent accidental connections of 12 V appliances into 240 V socket-outlets. This connector is also used for temporary equipment in emergency vehicles.

The connector pins are mutually perpendicular, and are usually oriented to look like a capital T. Polarity at the outlet can be random, and must be verified to avoid equipment damage.

=== USB socket ===
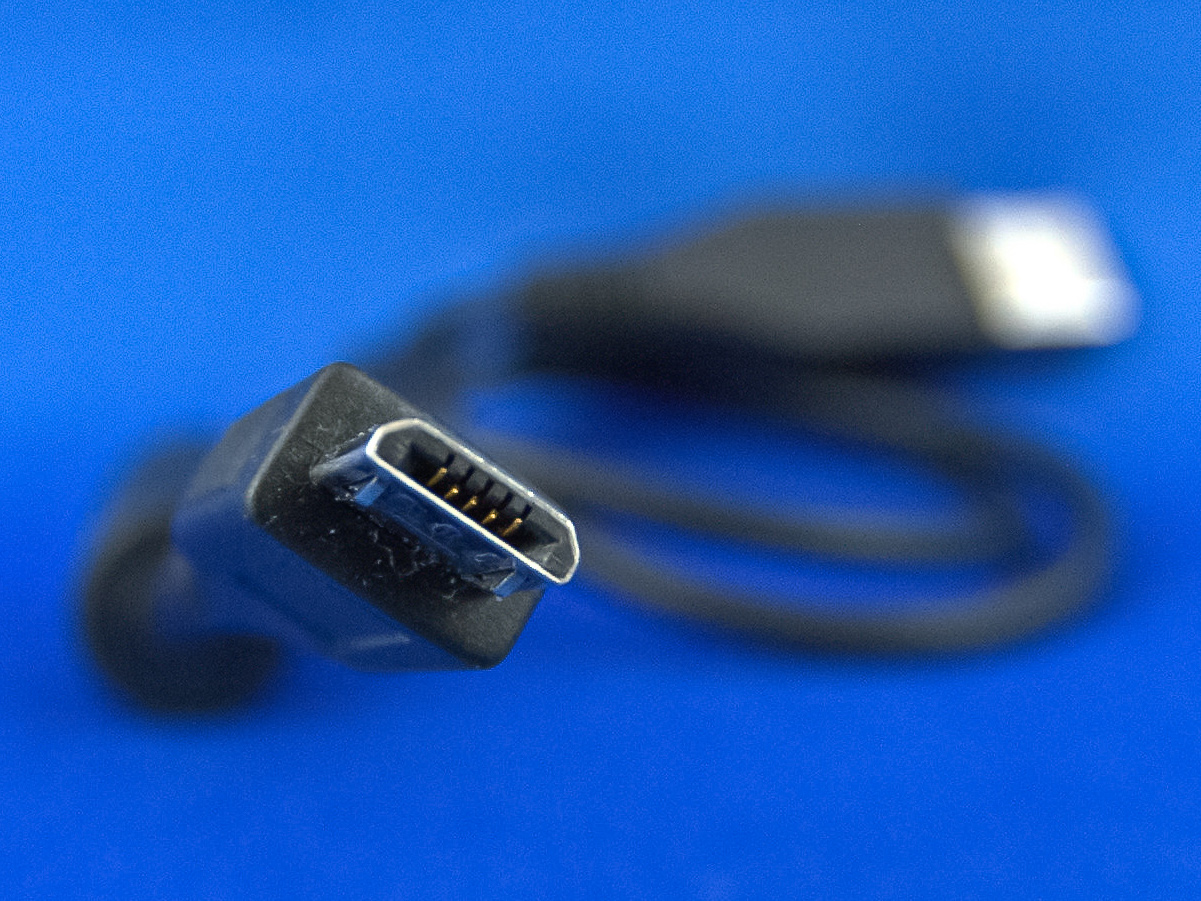
Micro-B USB

Due to the popularity of USB for mobile phones and tablets, USB sockets and plugs have become a common choice for other small devices that require five volts or less, even those that require no data connection. Examples include flashlights, toys such as small helicopters, and rechargeable battery packs (which in turn provide five volts over USB to recharge other devices). Wall sockets with built-in USB power adapters and USB sockets are available.

In 2009, the EU created a common external power supply specification, a voluntary specification which encouraged mobile phone manufacturers to use the micro USB-B connector. As of 2016, most new mobile phones used this connector for charging.

In 2012, the USB Power Delivery (PD) specification was released. The USB PD specification provides the ability for 5 V devices to draw more than (the USB battery-charging specification limit of) 7.5 W of power from USB "PD-aware" ports when using PD-aware USB cables. The specification also allows USB PD ports to provide even greater power at higher voltages over PD-aware cables – up to 36 W at 12 V and 60 W at 20 V (for micro-USB connectors) and up to 60 W at 12 V and 100 W at 20 V (for standard USB A/B connectors).

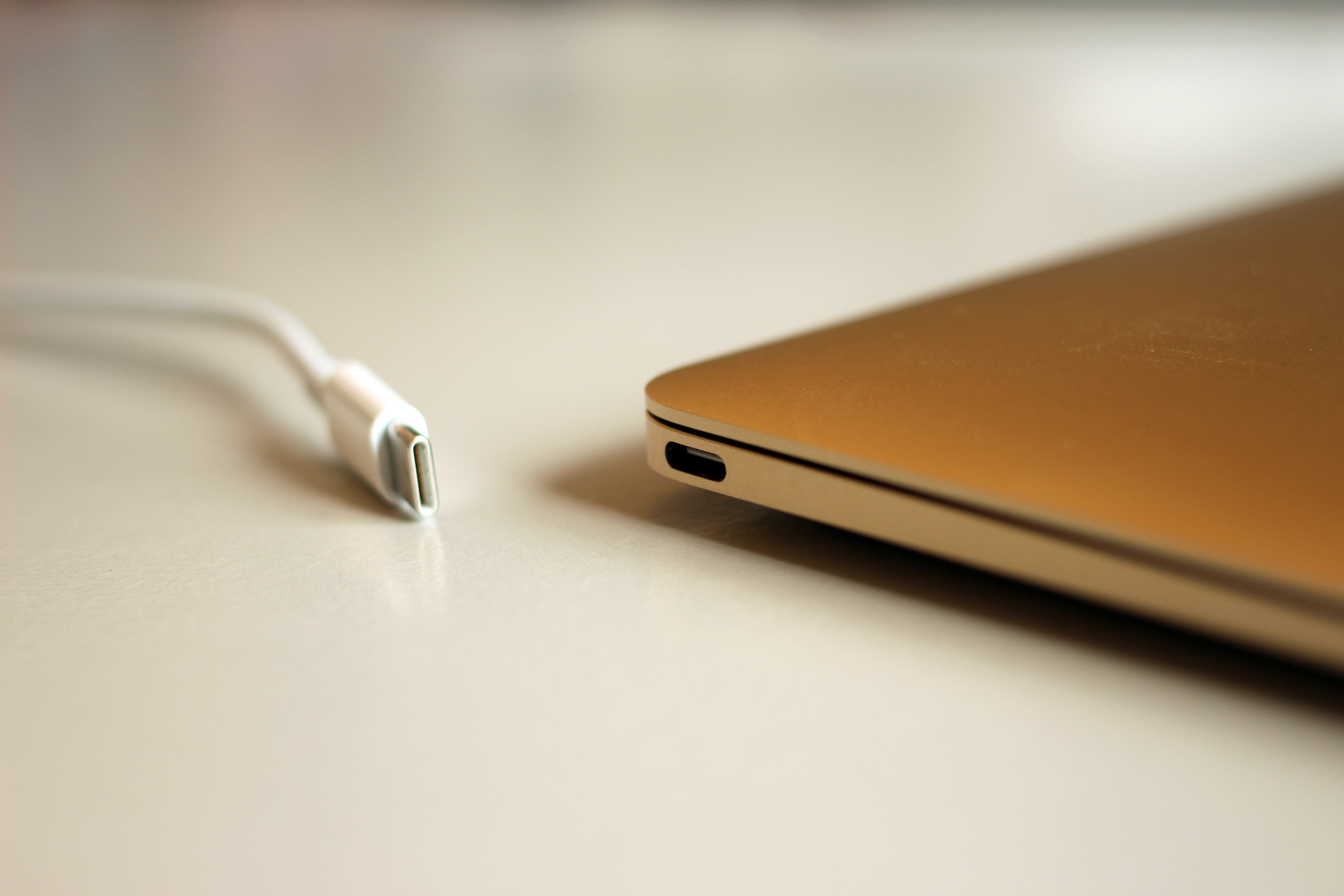
The 12-inch 2015 MacBook uses a USB-C port for charging

After previous connectors were deprecated in USB 3.2, the new USB-C plug has become a new standard for charging (and data transfer) over USB.

In the European Union, the Radio Equipment Directive 2021/0291, requires new smartphones to use USB-C as a universal charger by the end of 2024, and laptops by 2026.

=== Other DC connectors ===
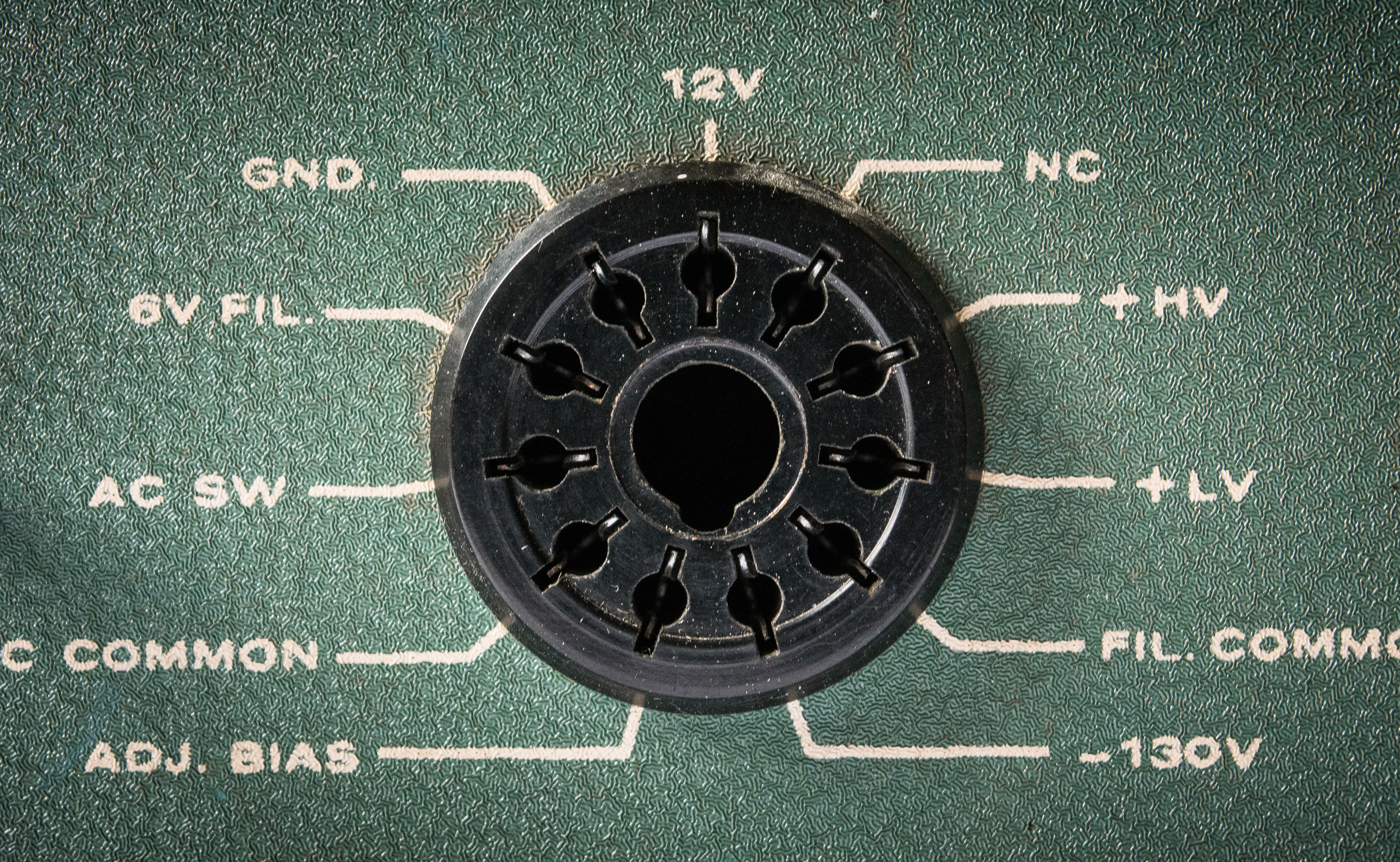
Heathkit power supply female connector for tube equipment

- There are a number of similar design PC board power connectors, including Molex Mini-Fit SR, Molex Mini-fit jr., MOLEX MICROFIT and Molex SABRE connectors, and AMP DUAC connectors that look similar to each other.
- Some plugs with three, four, five or more pins are also called DC plugs. These were common on vacuum tube equipment and continue to be used where several voltages are supplied. On vacuum tube equipment the pins are normally on the equipment side of the join for safety reasons.
- Many mobile phones use DC connectors that are unique to the manufacturer, or even a specific phone. In the interest of improved interoperability of phone battery chargers, major manufacturers have agreed to standardize on the micro-USB connector for new phone chargers from 2010.
- Many manufacturers make special-purpose DC power connectors for battery packs, instruments, medical equipment, communications equipment and other devices.
- Power Pack (PP) series of batteries such as the PP3 nine-volt battery have circular and hexagonal terminals which mate with a "snap" connector with physically identical (but opposite-polarity) terminals.
- Special "octal" connectors with either 8 or 11 pins, almost identical to octal relay sockets or tube sockets, were used to connect power supplies to some tube audio amplifiers, transmitters, and transceivers (especially in amateur radio models). Female sockets were installed on the power supply and male sockets (with exposed pins) on the radio equipment. Cable assemblies with mating connectors were also readily available. These connections transferred anode positive voltage (typically 600 VDC for Heathkit, 800 VDC for Collins), grid negative bias (−130 VDC), 6.3 and 12.6 VAC for heaters (filaments), and control functions (remote mains switching).

== Low voltage (120–1,500 VDC) ==
These low voltage connectors are rated at or below 1,500 VDC.

=== Anderson SBS ===
The Anderson SBS (commonly referred to as Anderson plug) and SBS Mini series of connectors are rated at up to 600 VDC at (depending on the connector) 50 A, 75 A or 110 A. They are only rated for disconnection under load at up to 120 VDC however.

These connectors see use in vehicle dual battery systems and higher power UPS systems, where the battery bank voltages are between 48 VDC and 500 VDC.

=== MC4 connector ===
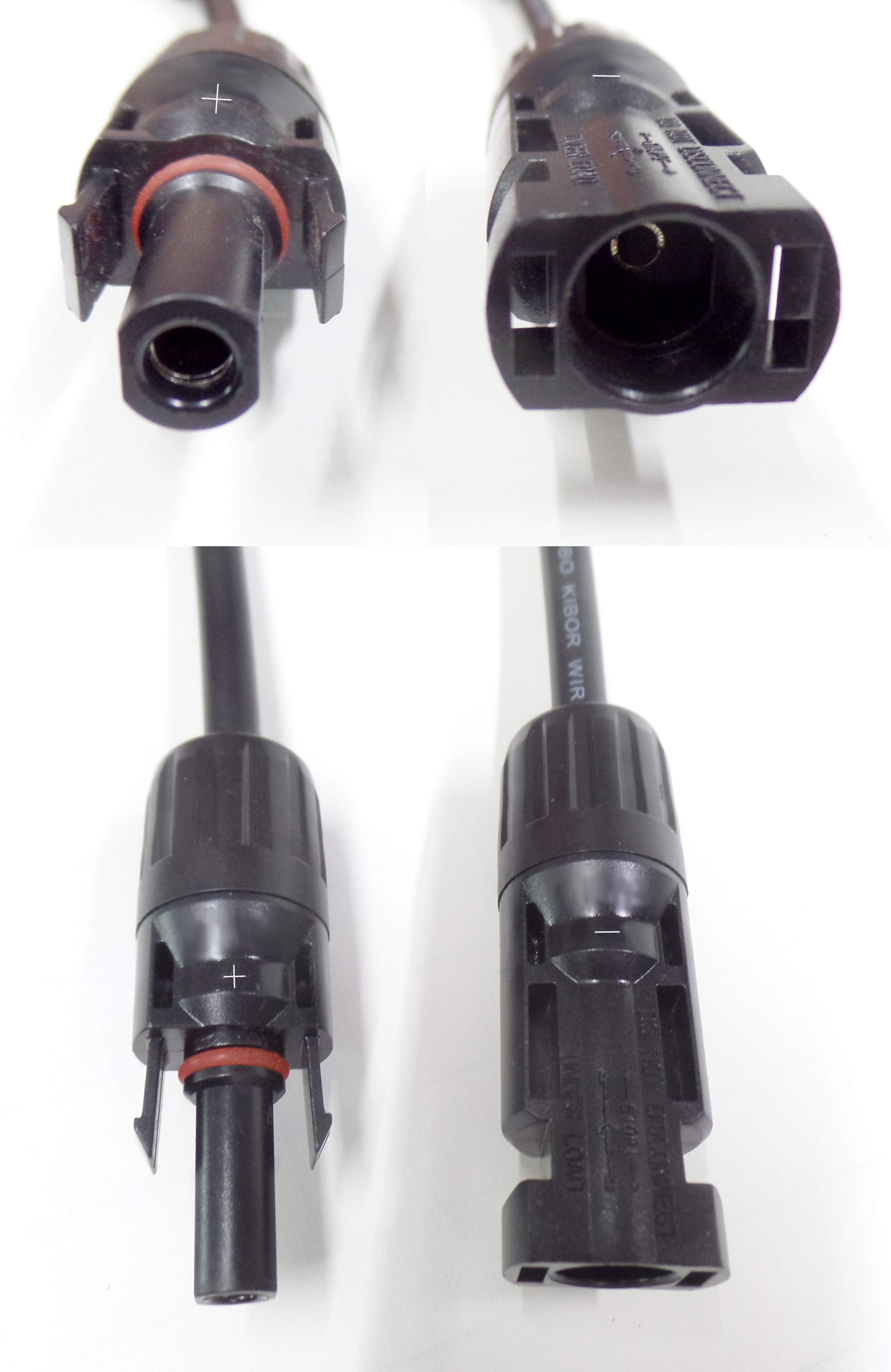
MC4 connectors, used on solar panels

MC4 connectors, originally from Stäubli but also commonly cloned, are common on photovoltaic panels. Because these panels are exposed to the weather for decades, MC4 includes a rubber sealing ring to keep out moisture. Because solar panels are often stacked in strings of hundreds of volts, MC4 has locking clips to hold the wires together. Because solar panels can be connected in series strings, or parallel arrays, the positive and negative terminals use separate connectors.

=== IEC 61076 (LV) ===
M12 F-coding, 2-4 pins, 300 Vdc 16 A

The International Electrotechnical Commission (IEC) has standardized a set of multi-pin screw plugs matching ISO metric screw thread, available in M5, M8 and M12 sizes (see #IEC 61076 (ELV) above). The M12 F-coding is rated for 300 V.

=== IEC TS 62735 ===
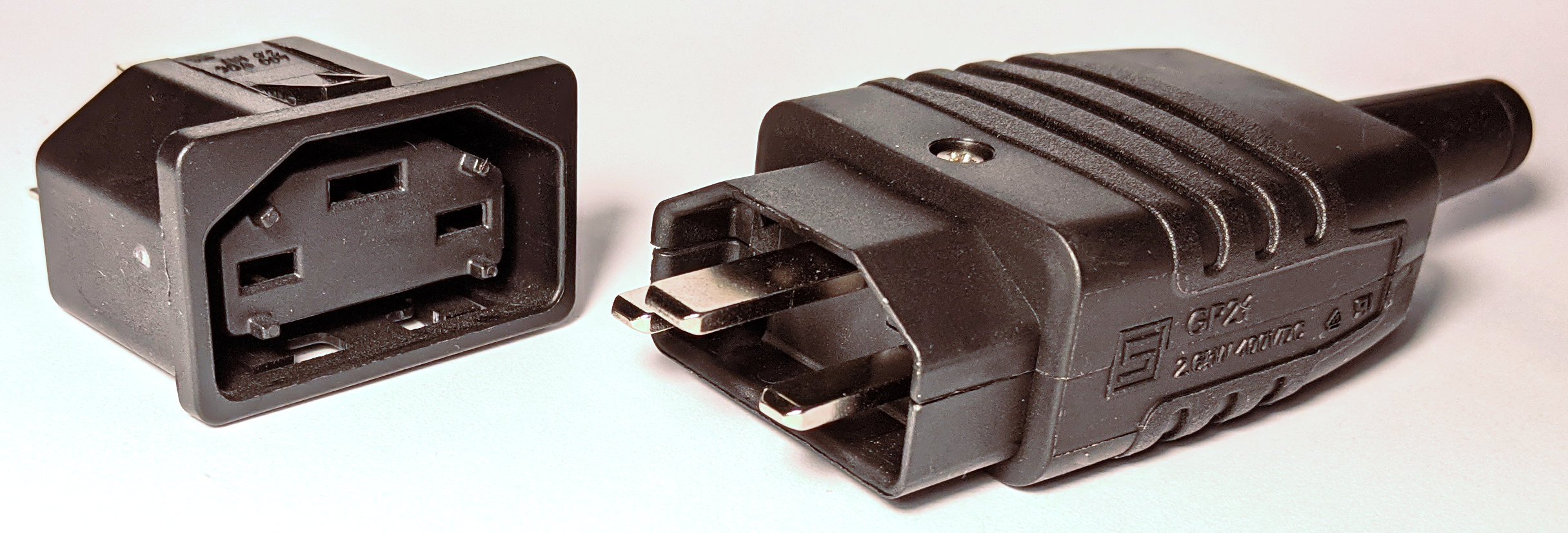
IEC TS 62735 plug and socket, 2.6 kW version

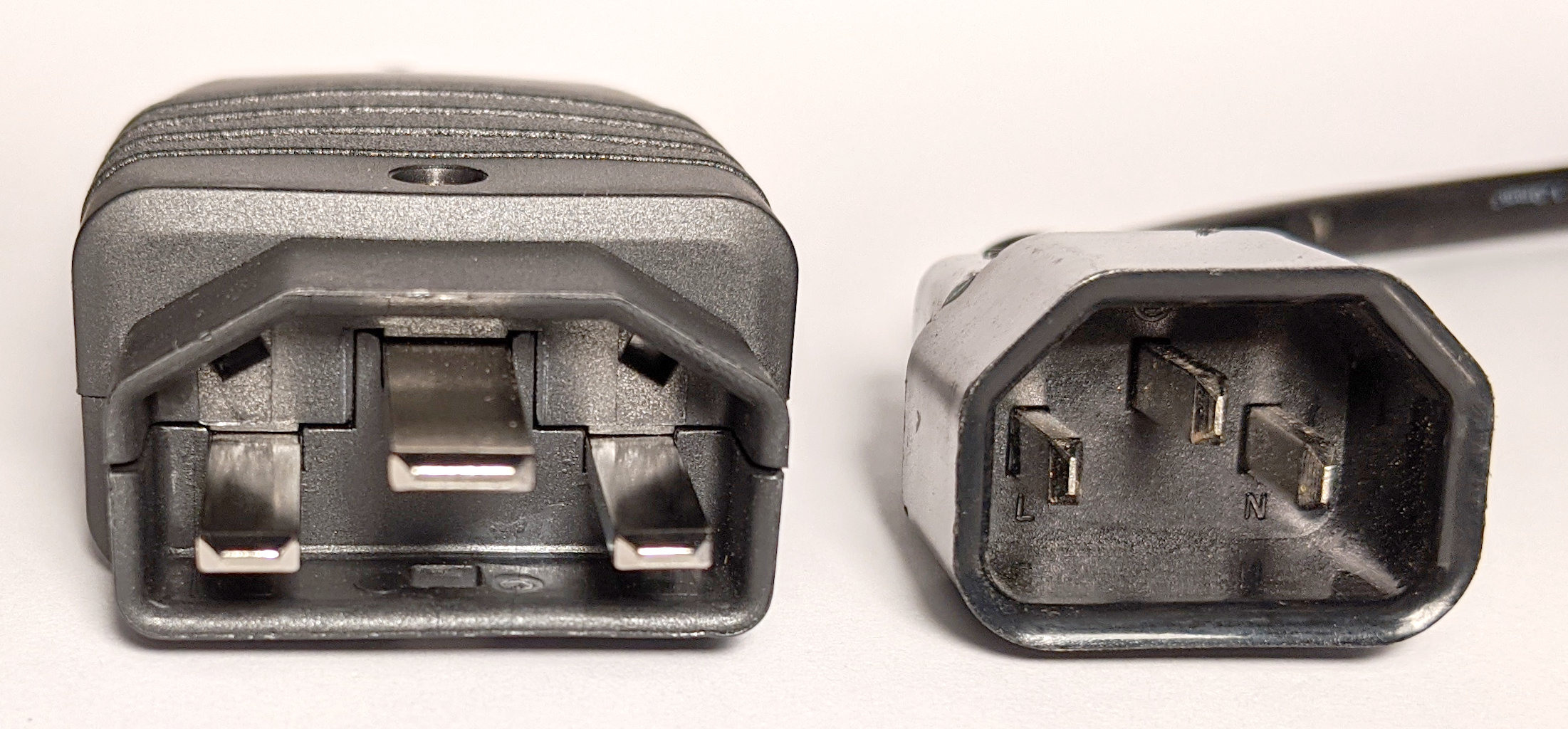
Comparison of 2.6 kW IEC TS 62735 (left) and IEC320 C14 (right) inlets for receiving power

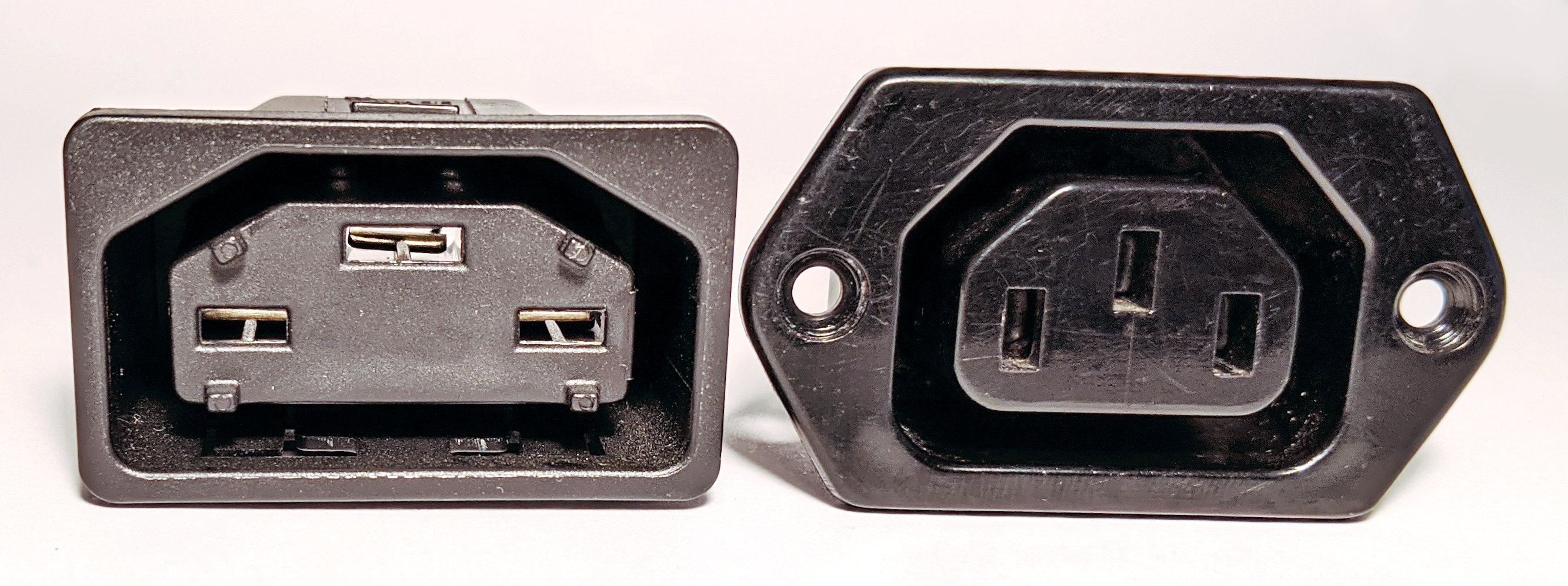
Comparison of 2.6 kW IEC TS 62735 (left) and IEC320 C13 (right) outlets for supplying power

The IEC TS 62735 standard specifies connectors capable of carrying between 294 and 400 VDC. There are two connectors in the standard rated at 2.6 kW and 5.2 kW. The lower current plug can be inserted into the higher current socket, but the higher current plug will not mate with the lower current socket. The 2.6 kW plug can be disconnected under load, but the 5.2 kW plug cannot.

Designed primarily for supplying power to computer and communications equipment, these connectors are intended to allow data centers to migrate towards supplying equipment with DC power as an alternative to AC.

=== Anderson Saf-D-Grid ===
The Anderson Saf-D-Grid connector delivers up to 600 VDC at up to 30 A, with the connector occupying the same space as an IEC 320 C13/C14 connector normally limited to 250 VAC at 10 A. The connector can also be disconnected under load.

Like the IEC 62735, this connector was designed to replace the IEC connector used in computer power supplies so that they can be operated from 380–400 VDC instead. Introduced in January 2009, it arrived before the competing IEC standard, however despite this it has not seen widespread use.

=== Molex Imperium ===
The Imperium connector from Molex is aimed at automotive applications and is rated at 1,000 VDC at 250 A. As of 2021 the manufacturer has classed this connector as obsolete.

=== Vehicle charging connectors ===
In order to avoid heavy transformers onboard vehicles, high power charging of battery electric vehicles has the transformers in the ground station, and supply to the vehicle is done with DC at around 400 volts.

There are some competing standards:

- Combined Charging System (CCS) in Europe and Americas
- Megawatt Charging System (MCS)
- NACS in North America
- GB/T in China
- CHAdeMO in Japan and for Japanese vehicles
- ChaoJi

== High voltage (over 1,500 VDC) ==
These high voltage connectors are rated for voltages above 1,500 VDC.

=== Banana connector ===
The Banana connector, normally only rated for extra-low voltage, is available in a high voltage variant as well. This version of the connector contains a thick shroud around both male and female connectors, permitting use at voltages of up to 30 kV. The shroud is typically deep enough to prevent connection by traditional banana plugs. This style of connector is often seen on high voltage test equipment, such as power supplies and volt meters capable of handling 10 kV and above.

== See also ==
- Banana connector
- Battery terminal
- Binding post
- Cable tie
- FASTON terminal
- MagSafe, for Mac laptops
- MagSafe (wireless charger), for iPhone and AirPods
- Phone connector (audio)
- RCA connector
- Speaker terminal
- Telephone jack and plug
