= ISO 4165 =

ISO standard

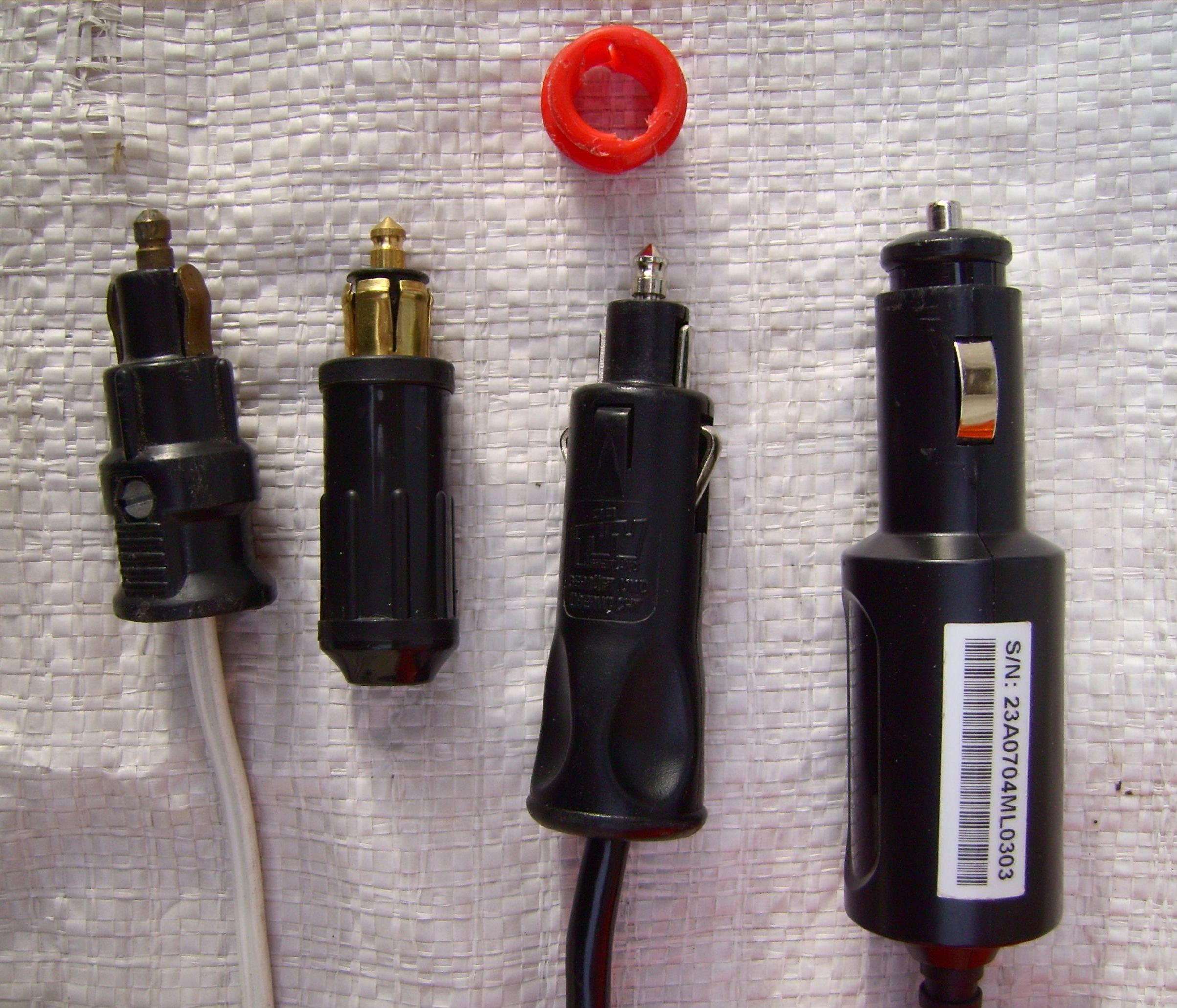
Comparison of (L to R) two Powerlet plugs, one combination plug, and one Cigar Lighter Plug

ISO 4165 is a standard adopted by the International Organization for Standardization (ISO) that describes a double-pole DC connector to supply between 12 and 24 V DC at up to 12 amps to appliances in vehicles. Although roughly similar in design to an automotive accessory receptacle, the ISO 4165 connector is shorter and smaller in diameter. It was originally a standard fitting on all the German military vehicles during World War II.

The body (which remains outside the receptacle) is 20 mm in diameter. The resilient neck must mate with a 12 mm diameter hole. The center pin is 5 mm in diameter.

The ISO 4165:2001 DC connector is also known as the BMW Accessory plug, as it is used on BMW motorcycles; as the Powerlet connector, named after a firm that produces them; and, in Australia (where they are popular in mobile power applications, including 4WD and Caravaning), as the Hella plug, or Merit plug.

At least one manufacturer sells a plug that combines a cigarette lighter plug and a powerlet, in much the same way that combination auto/airplane notebook computer power adapters combine a cigarette lighter plug and an ARINC 628/EmPower plug.

== Development ==
- Technical Committee ISO/TC 22, Road vehicles, Subcommittee SC 3, Electrical and electronic equipment

== Versions ==
- ISO 4165:2001 (Second Edition; revisions to the figures and addition of test procedures)
- ISO 4165:1979 (Original ISO version of standard; withdrawn)
- BS EN ISO 4165:2003 (British Standard version; current)
- BS EN 24165:1992 (British Standard version; withdrawn)

== See also ==
- Automobile auxiliary power outlet
- USB charger
