= Marine Technology Society =

Professional society in the field of marine technology

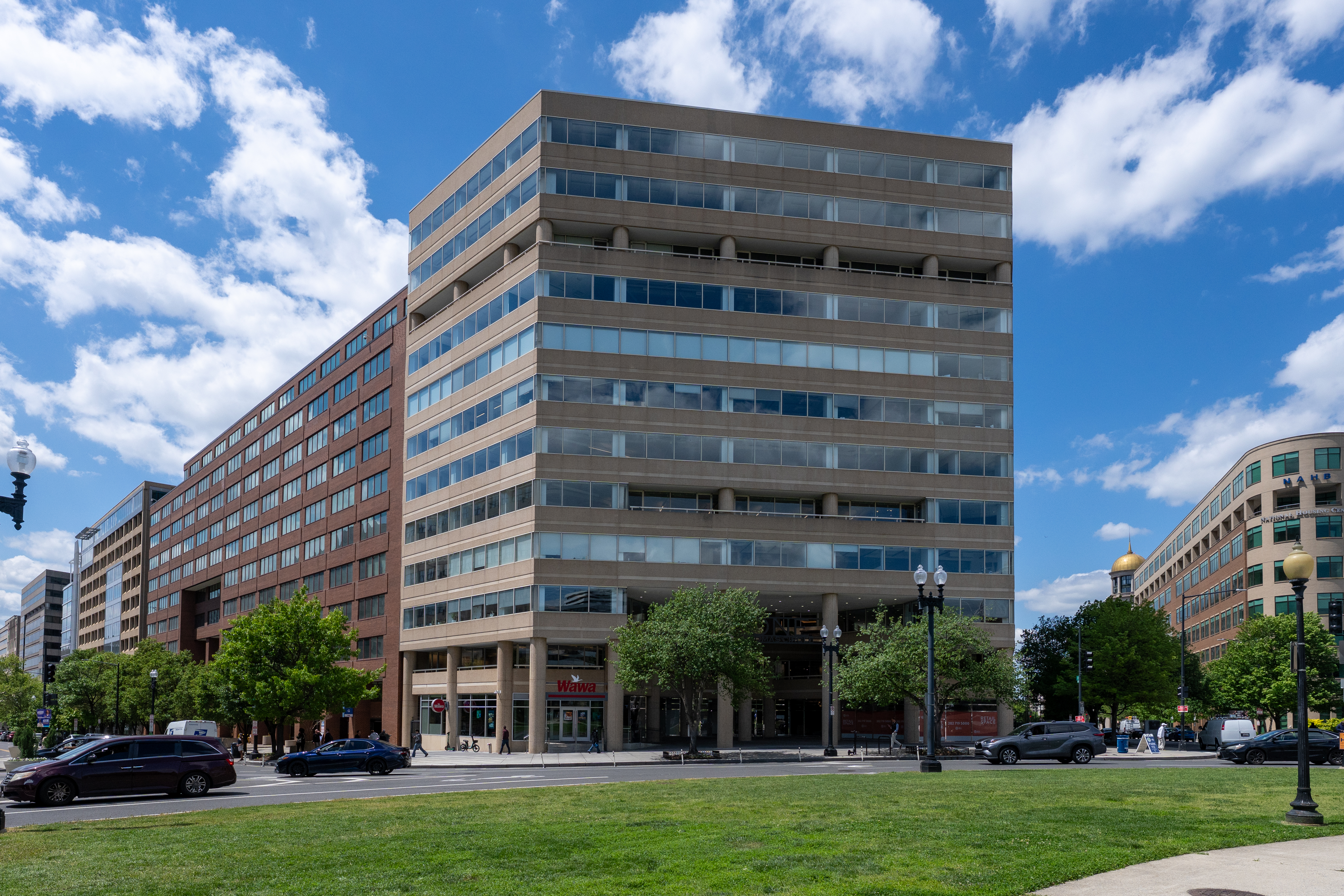
Headquarters in Washington, D.C.

The Marine Technology Society (MTS) is a professional society that serves an international community of approximately 2,000 ocean engineers, technologists, policy-makers, and educators. The goal of the society, which was founded in 1963, is to promote awareness, understanding, advancement and application of marine technology. The association is based in Washington, District of Columbia, United States.

== Background ==
The society consists of 29 technical disciplines and presently has 17 sections, including overseas sections in Japan, Korea and Norway. In addition, MTS has 23 student sections at colleges and universities with related fields of study.

The flagship publication of the society is the MTS Journal. The journal is published 4 times annually and primarily features themed issues consisting of invited papers. The journal has a current Scopus Cite Score of 2.1.

MTS sponsors several conferences of note, including the OCEANS Conference (co-sponsosed with IEEE/OES), Underwater Intervention (co-sponsored with ADCI), Dynamic Positioning Conference, biennial Buoy Workshop (co-sponsored with the Office of Naval Research), and the hot-topic workshop series TechSurge.

In 1969 the group held its annual convention in Miami Beach. The convention was addressed by Spiro Agnew, who was then Vice President of the United States.

In 1993 the laser line scan, a U.S. Navy photography secret, made its debut at the society sponsored trade show in New Orleans.

In 2023 the MATE ROV Competition joined MTS as a fully integrated program within the Society. For more than 20 years, the MATE ROV Competition has given children, youth, and young adults an inclusive platform to think critically about real-world problems in a way that strengthens communication, builds peer-to-peer community, and inspires entrepreneurship. Since its inauguration, the annual competition has reached more than 20,000 students in 46 regions around the world.
