= MATE ROV Competition =

Student underwater robotics competition organized by MATE Inspiration for Innovation

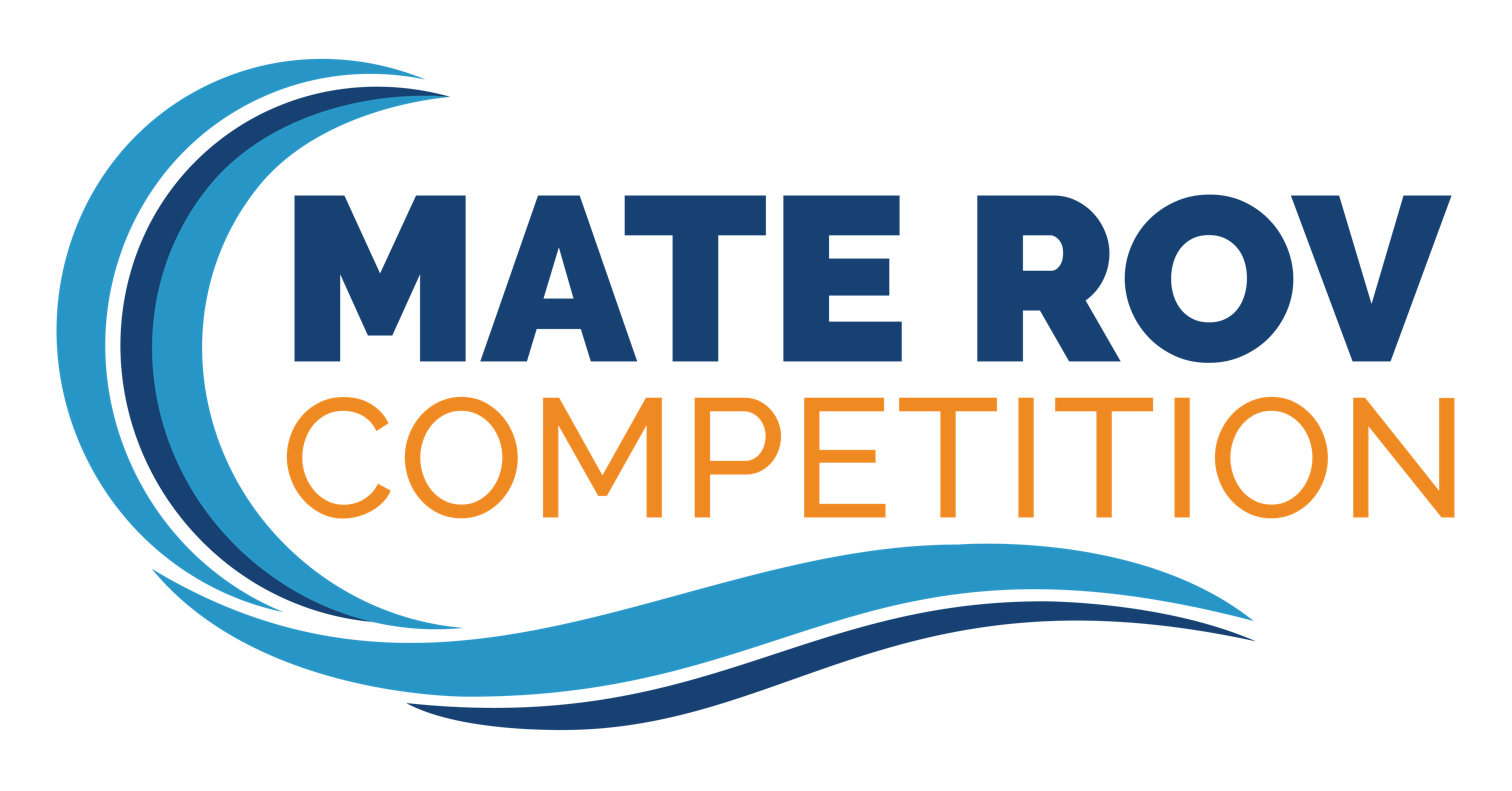
- Sport: Robotics-related sports
- Founded: 2001
- Director: Jill Zande
- No. of teams: 79
- Most recent champions: Case Western Reserve University - EXPLORER Class; Embry-Riddle Aeronautical University - PIONEER Class; Palos Verdes High School - RANGER Class
- Website: Official website

The Marine Advanced Technology Education Remotely Operated Vehicle Competition (MATE ROV Competition) is an annual, international underwater robotics contest that challenges K–12, community-college, and university teams to design, build, and pilot ROVs while presenting their projects as if they were start-up “companies.” The event emphasizes real-world engineering, business, and communication skills alongside in-water missions that mirror tasks carried out by the ocean-technology industry.

== History ==
The contest grew out of the National Science Foundation-funded MATE Center at Monterey Peninsula College. Working with the Marine Technology Society ROV Committee, the center staged the first competition in 2001; fifteen years later the program was formalized under the nonprofit MATE Inspiration for Innovation (MATE II), incorporated in California in 2016. Early championships rotated among U.S. coastal venues, including the University of California, Santa Barbara (2004) and the NASA Johnson Space Center’s Neutral Buoyancy Laboratory in Houston for the 10th-anniversary event in 2011. After a pandemic-related cancellation in 2020, East Tennessee State University hosted a hybrid in-person/telepresence championship in 2021. The 20th World Championship took place at Long Beach City College, California, in June 2022, marking two decades of competition. In June 2025 more than 70 teams from 18 countries gathered at NOAA’s Thunder Bay National Marine Sanctuary in Alpena, Michigan, for the latest World Championship.

== Competition Structure ==
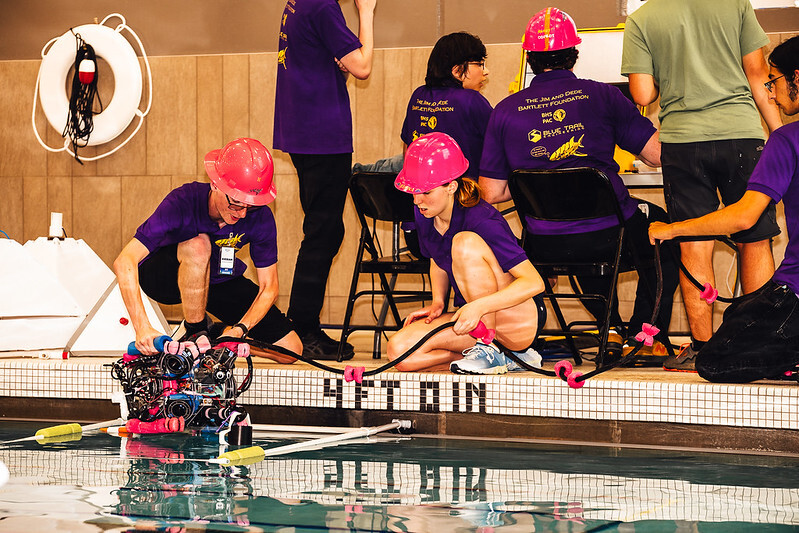
Students and their competition ROV

Teams enter one of four main classes - SCOUT (entry level), NAVIGATOR, RANGER, and EXPLORER (advanced university level)—with an occasional PIONEER pilot class for emerging formats. The tiered system lets students build progressively more complex vehicles and business collateral while remaining age-appropriate.

Besides piloting their ROVs through timed mission tasks, companies must submit engineering/technical reports, create marketing displays or posters, and deliver sales-style presentations to panels of working professionals who serve as judges.

=== Regional Qualifiers ===
A network of 38 regional contests across North America, Europe, Asia, and the Middle East feeds the RANGER (and, in some regions, EXPLORER) class of the international championship; regional events may also offer SCOUT and NAVIGATOR divisions that conclude locally.

=== World-championship venues (selected) ===
- 2011 – Neutral Buoyancy Laboratory, NASA Johnson Space Center, Texas, USA (10th anniversary)
- 2021 – East Tennessee State University, Tennessee, USA (hybrid in-person & virtual)
- 2022 – Long Beach City College, California, USA (20th championship)
- 2023 – St. Vrain Valley School District, Colorado, USA
- 2025 – Thunder Bay National Marine Sanctuary, Alpena, Michigan, USA
- 2026 – Fisheries and Marine Institute of Memorial University, Newfoundland, Canada
- 2027 - Weyerhaeuser King County Aquatic Center, Federal Way, Washington, USA

== Impact ==
Educators and industry sponsors view the competition as a pipeline for the blue economy workforce: it fosters STEM literacy, teamwork, project management, and entrepreneurial thinking while exposing students to careers in marine robotics, renewable energy, offshore aquaculture, and ocean research.

Media coverage of recent championships highlights both the educational value and the community atmosphere, with local and regional outlets noting the influx of international teams, the emphasis on environmental missions, and the networking opportunities for young innovators.
