= EmPower (aircraft power adapter) =

Power connector used on passenger airplanes

EmPower is a brand name that refers to three different power outlets available on commercial airlines:

- 15-volt, 75-watt DC connector (now called EmPower Classic by the vendor)
- 5-volt, 10-watt USB power-only jacks
- 110-volt AC power jacks (some also have an EmPower USB jack)

== Original 15-volt EmPower connector ==
15-volt DC connector type found on many commercial airlines designed to provide power to travelers' electronic devices. The system is limited to 75 watts. The use of a special connector is to prevent laptops charging at altitude and ensure that only approved adapters can be used.

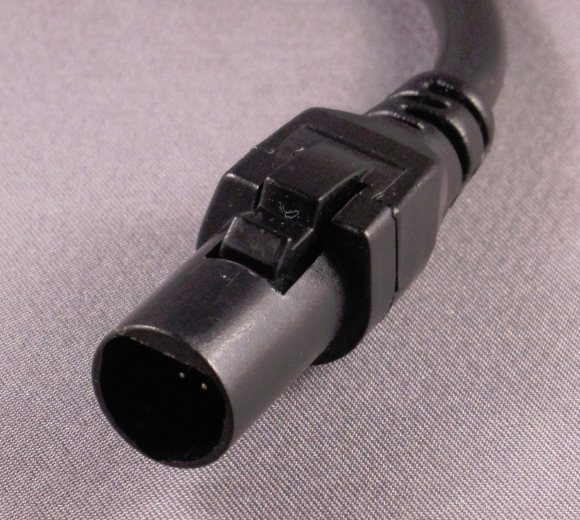
EmPower plug

Some airlines offer it only in business class or only in certain types of aircraft or flights. Travelers in the 2000s bought EmPower adapters, frequently from duty-free shops at airports, to run laptops and other electronic equipment without using battery power.

Supporting airlines include:

- Some Air France planes
- Some Air India planes
- Some American Airlines planes
- Some British Airways planes
- Some Qantas planes
- Some United Airlines planes
- Some Virgin Atlantic planes
- Almost all Alitalia planes
- Almost all Cathay Pacific planes

(The SeatGuru web site contains more detailed information on which flights support EmPower.)

Adapters exist to connect EmPower plugs to cigarette lighter receptacles and most EmPower power adapters come with these.

EmPower is a trademark registered initially by Primex Technologies (VA) and assigned to Astronics Advanced Electronic Systems, Inc., in Kirkland, Washington, United States. Subsequently, the trademark has been expanded to include not just the proprietary 15 V DC connector but also the 120 V 60 Hz AC in-seat power (and video entertainment) systems. American Airlines uses EmPower 120 V AC outlets (standard 2 prong plus ground) on their newer 737s.

Many laptops will not function properly at 75 W. The new 60 Hz AC EmPower system provides more power than the DC system.

The AC EmPower system converts aircraft 400 Hz AC or wild frequency power to standard 60 Hz AC to prevent additional stresses in laptop chargers already stressed by reduced cooling at altitude. Laptops on this system will still charge batteries. Modern laptop batteries, however, include a temperature sensor that should compensate for the reduced cooling at altitude. This new system accepts various national power plugs and most laptop chargers will function properly at 120 V 60 Hz AC even if sold in 230 V 50 Hz AC markets.

Apple offered an EmPower MagSafe power adapter for their MacBook, MacBook Pro, and MacBook Air lines of notebooks, and also included a cigarette lighter socket adapter. However, this system would only run the computer without charging the computer's battery, and Apple warned users to never plug this device into a car's cigarette lighter outlet. This product was later discontinued.

Even though EmPower adapters are rated at 15 volts instead of 12 volts like cigar lighter receptacles, most accessories made for the so-called "12-volt outlets" have enough voltage tolerance to allow for a voltage as high as 15 without step down DC-to-DC converter.

== Modern AC and USB EmPower outlets ==
Universal airline AC socket layout

EmPower is a 120-volt universal connector type found on many commercial airlines designed to provide power to travelers' electronic devices. The system is limited to 200 VA. The EmPower universal AC outlet is compatible with power plugs from over 170 countries and is designed such that 110 V AC power is not present at the outlet until a suitable plug is fully inserted.

The AC EmPower system converts aircraft 400 Hz AC or wild frequency power to standard 60 Hz AC.
