= Automobile auxiliary power outlet =

Outlet for portable accessories

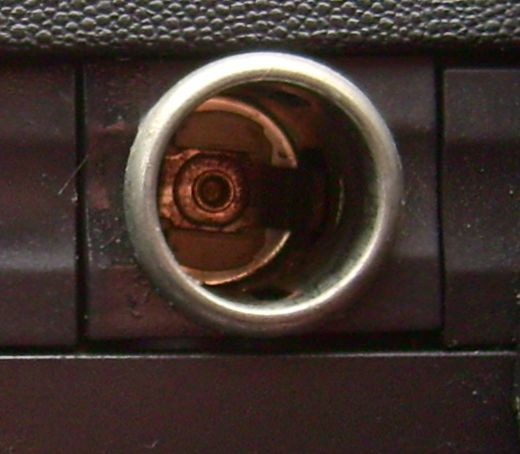
Auxiliary power outlet for front passengers

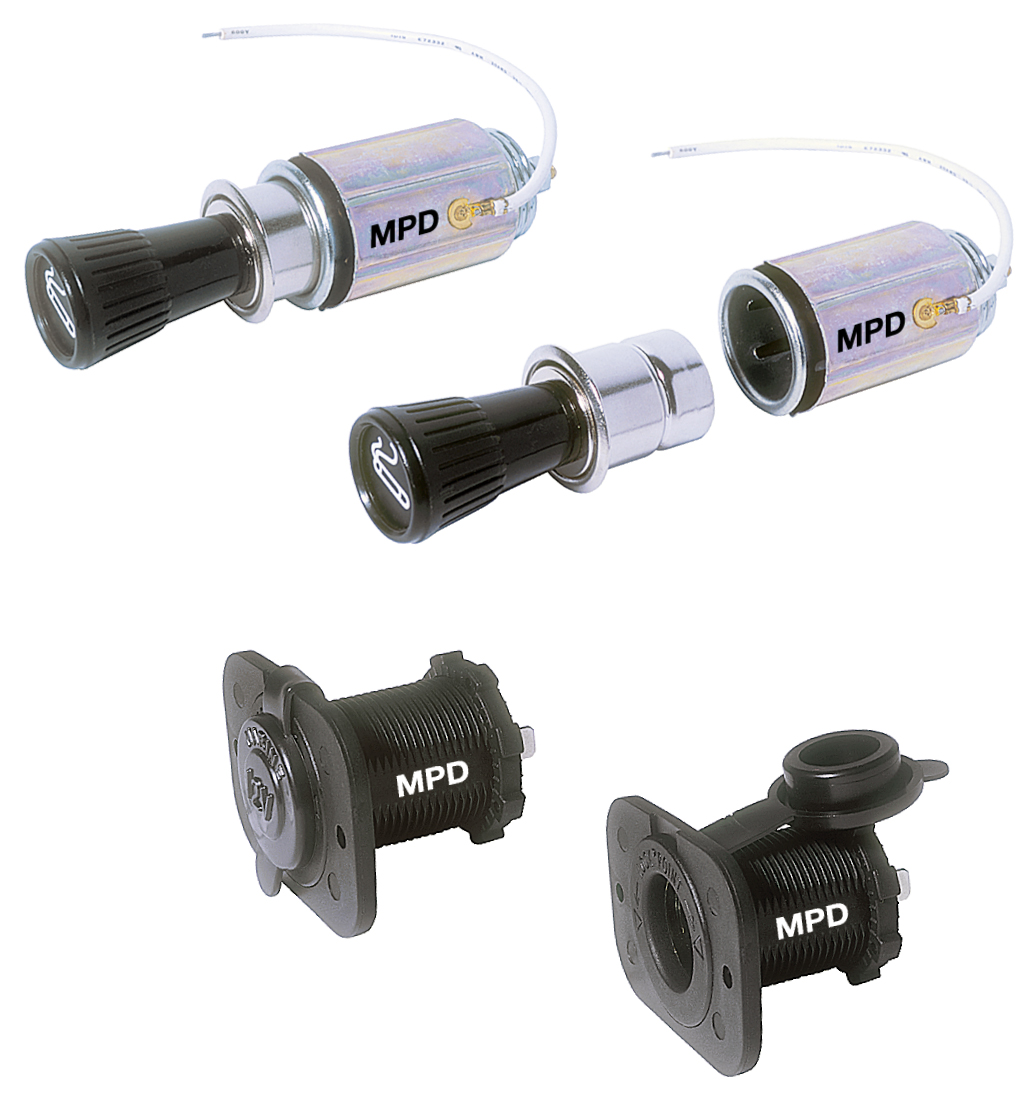
Metal and plastic cigarette lighter receptacles

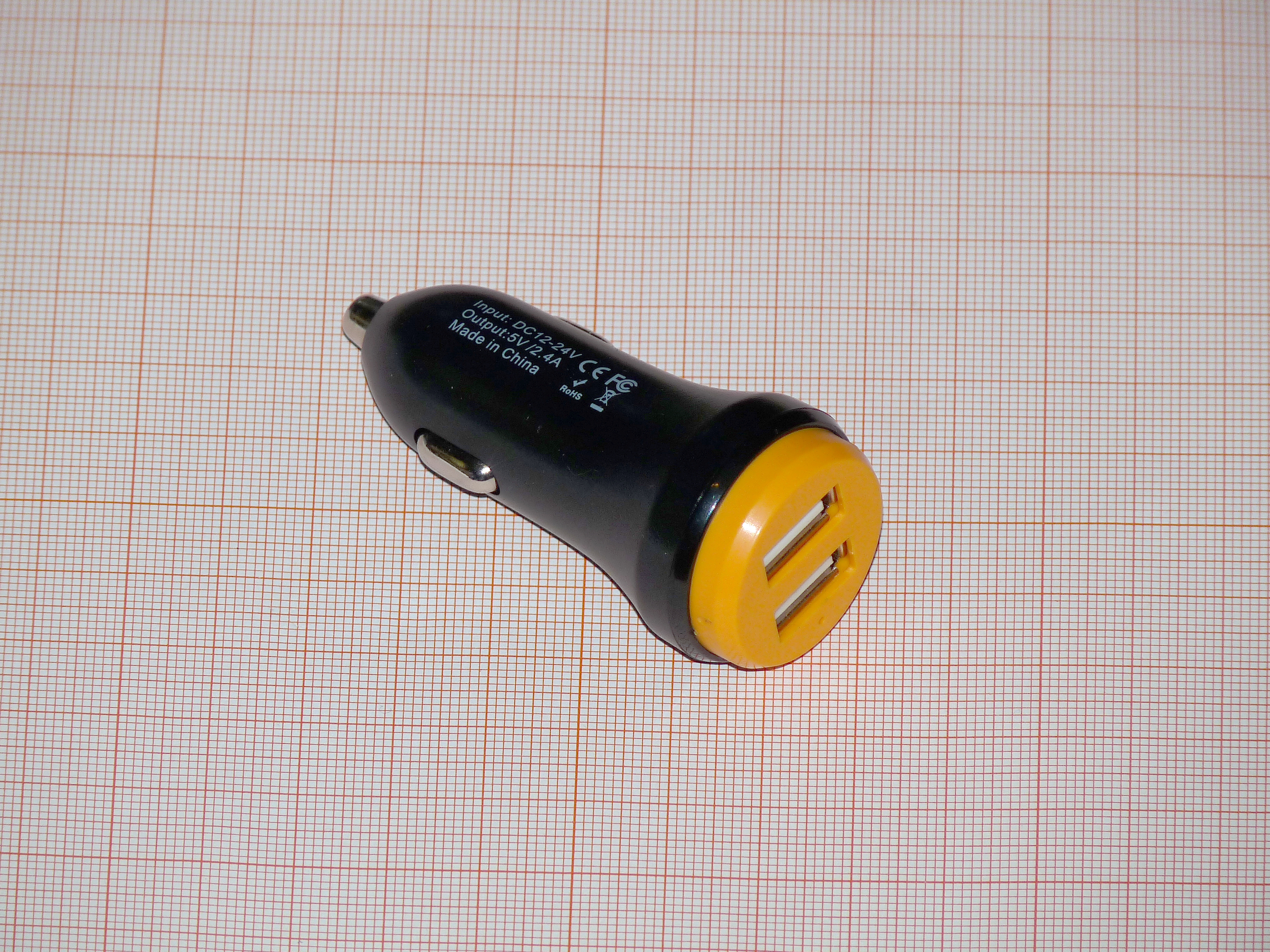
Mobile phone charger for use in automobiles

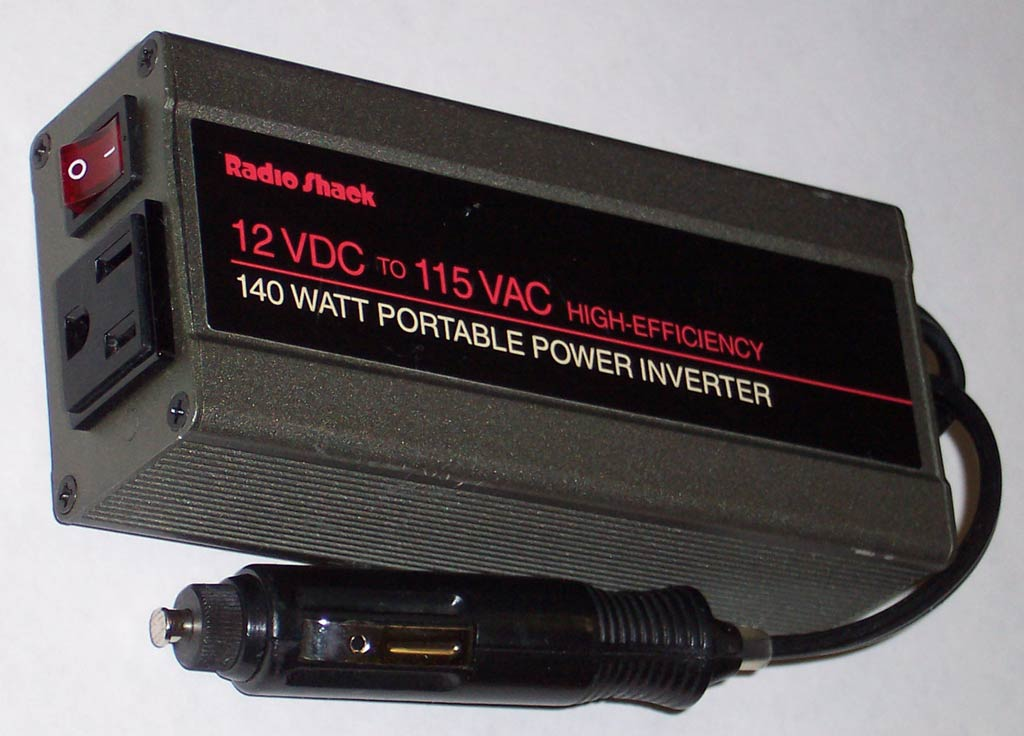
Power inverter for producing 60 hertz square wave power from an automobile outlet as a way to power home appliances.

An automobile auxiliary power outlet (also known as car cigarette lighter, vehicle cigarette lighter or auxiliary power outlet) in an automobile was initially designed to power an electrically heated cigarette lighter, but became a de facto standard DC connector to supply electrical power for portable accessories used in or near an automobile directly from the vehicle's electrical system. Such items include mobile phone chargers, cooling fans, portable fridges, electric air pumps, and power inverters.

In most vehicles, at least one car outlet is present. Some vehicles may have more power outlets: usually one for the front passengers, one for the rear passengers and one for the luggage trunk.

The voltage of the power outlet is usually near 12 V DC, and may be elevated between 13.5 V to 15 V while the engine is running. On trucks, the voltage of the power outlet may be near 24 V DC.

The 12 V power circuit is protected by a car fuse, often rated at 10 to 20 amperes, which provides 120 to 240 watts of power. Large appliances such as hair dryers or toasters draw too much power to be fed from an auxiliary power socket. If wired directly rather than through the ignition, an empty car battery can be charged through the outlet from an external power source, which is more convenient albeit slower than currents supported through electrical clamps on the car battery.

Many modern vehicles no longer have the auxiliary power outlet, with it being replaced by USB 2.0 or USB-C ports.

== History ==
The electrical cigar-lighter was invented and patented in the early 1880s by the Swiss-Austrian inventor Friedrich Wilhelm Schindler. In the 1890s, these tools were sold as electrical cigar lighters (Cigarrenanzünder, later Zigarrenanzünder) in the major German warehouse catalogues. Before the Great Depression, cigarettes overtook cigars in sales, and they became more popularly known as "cigarette lighters", though they have remained the diameter of a standard cigar of 21 millimetres (0.83 in), or a 52 ring gauge.

In 1921, the Morris U.S. patent 1,376,154 was issued for a so-called "wireless" or "cordless" lighter with a removable element. The igniter was heated in the socket and then manually removed for use after an appropriate time interval.

In the United States, cigarette lighters started appearing in 1925–1926 in some models. They were a standard feature by the 1950s.

In 1928, the Connecticut Automotive Specialty Company (Casco) in Bridgeport patented its version of an automotive cigarette lighter, which used a cord and reel. In the reel-type lighters, the igniter unit was connected with a source of current by a cable that was wound on a spring drum so that the igniter unit and cable could be withdrawn from the socket and be used for lighting a cigar or cigarette. As the removable plug was returned to the socket, the wires were reeled back into it. The circuit was closed either by pressing a button or removing the igniter from its socket.

The modern "automatic" removable automotive V-Coil lighter was developed by Casco in 1956, for which it received U.S. patent 2,959,664, issued in 1960.

== Technical design ==
The sockets and mating plugs are defined in the ANSI/SAE J563 specification. For the 12-volt systems, the center contact is the positive terminal and the shell is the negative terminal. Most automobiles connect the negative terminal to the frame of the vehicle (negative ground).

12-volt auto connectors are made to comply with a standard by Underwriters Laboratories for safety. UL2089 was developed to cover the requirements for portable adapters rated 24 V DC or less that are intended to be supplied from the battery-powered electrical system of a vehicle. Products covered by the standard include cord assemblies of a plug that mates with the standard cigarette receptacle found in automobiles.

6-volt cigarette lighter receptacle and plug
Receptacle inside diameter: 21.34–21.46 mm (median 21.4 mm)
Plug body diameter: 21.08–21.23 mm (median 21.155 mm)
12-volt cigarette lighter receptacle and plug, size A
Receptacle inside diameter: 20.93–21.01 mm (median 20.97 mm)
Plug body diameter: 20.73–20.88 mm (median 20.805 mm)
Most often used in American automobiles
12-volt cigarette lighter receptacle and plug, size B
Receptacle inside diameter: 21.41–21.51 mm (median 21.455 mm)
Plug body diameter: 21.13–21.33 mm (median 21.18 mm)
Most often used in European automobiles, and sometimes as a second socket in American automobiles expressly for DC power connections.

Plugs often include a pilot light LED indicator to indicate that electrical power is connected. Optionally, the plug may be equipped with an internal fuse for electrical safety, usually rated at 10 amps or less. In some designs, the tip of the plug may be unscrewed to reveal a cylindrical glass fuse; other variants may use a blade-type fuse inserted into the side or back of the plug.

== Uses ==
=== Lighter ===
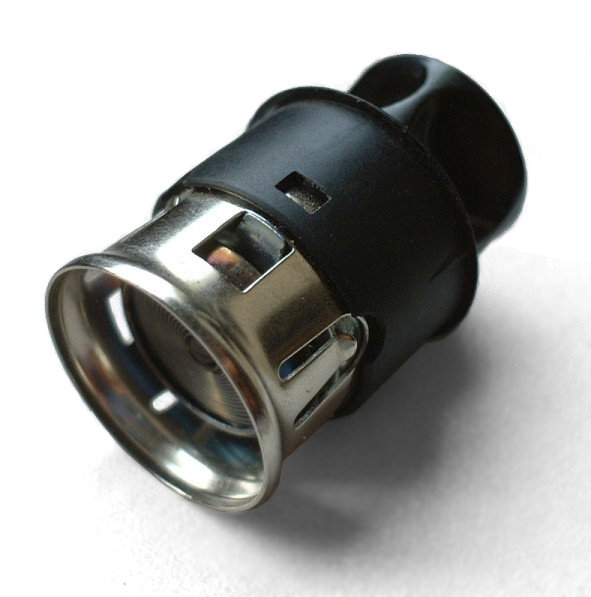
Car cigarette lighter, with heating element visible inside the front opening

The lighter is a metal or plastic cylinder containing a thin flat coil of nichrome metal strip, through which high current (≈10 amperes) passes when the device is activated, usually by pushing it into the socket as though it were a push-button. When pushed in, the lighter is held against the force of a spring by a clip attached to a bimetallic strip. The heating element glows orange hot in seconds, causing the bimetallic strip to bend and release the mechanism. The handle pops out, eliminating the need for the user to time the heating operation. If the lighter is then promptly removed from its socket, it can light a cigarette, cigar, or tinder.

A common feature of Italian cars in the 1960s to the 1970s, such as Alfa Romeos and Ferraris, is the Brico Pram cigarette lighter, which differs from conventional designs in that the lighter does not pop out for removal to light a cigarette, even though it visually resembles the traditional design. Instead, the center of the lighter features a tapered opening for the user to insert a cigarette until it touches the heating element, the rim of the handle is then pressed down to activate the lighter, the heating element then lights the cigarette and disengages the circuit with an audible ping once the desired temperature is reached as per a conventional lighter. The advantage of such a design is in safety as the red-hot heating element cannot be accidentally dropped onto an occupant's lap. Still, it takes away the ability for the lighter to be removed for the receptacle to be used as a power outlet, and it also does not allow cigars to be lit as the opening is not large enough.

=== Electrical outlet ===
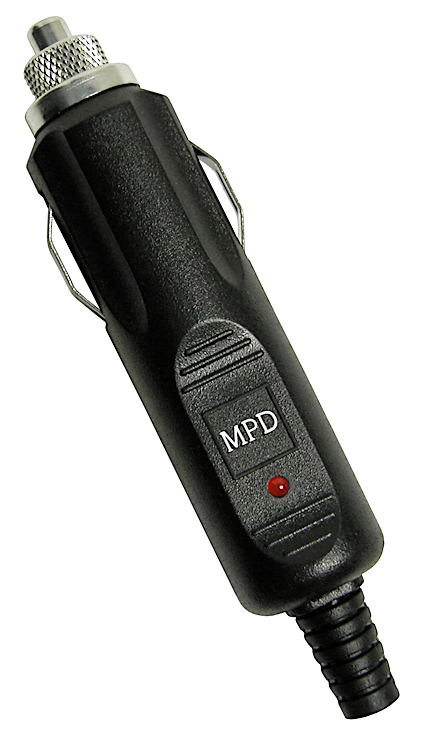
A 12-volt cigarette lighter plug, with a tip that may be unscrewed to replace an internal fuse

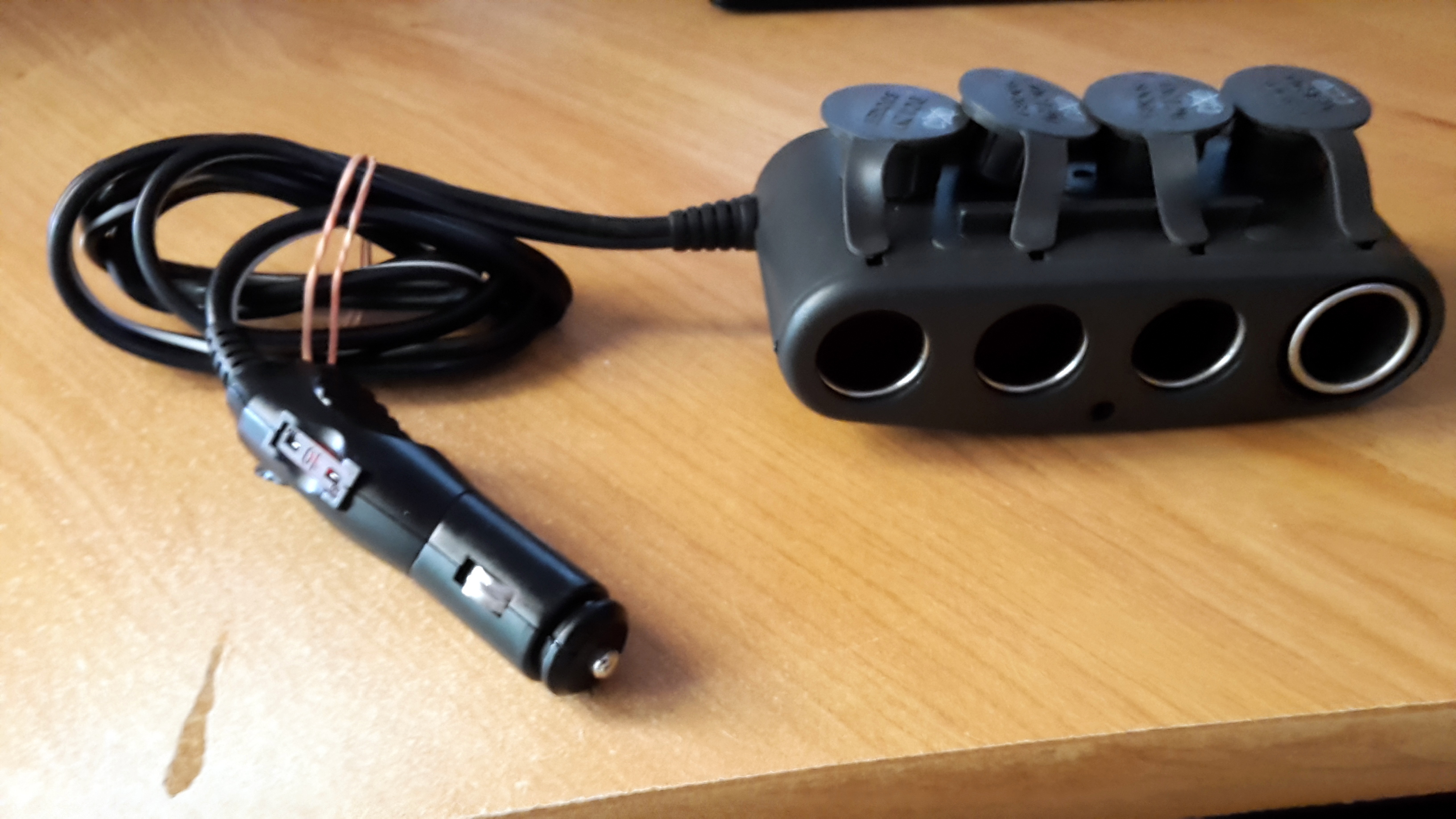
A power strip designed for use with auxiliary power outlets

In newer cars, the socket is equipped with a plastic cover without the lighter heating element. However, the socket has been repurposed and continues to be used to power consumer electronics in vehicles. Often, a vehicle may come with several outlets for convenience, some in the rear passenger area of the vehicle or the cargo area, for powering portable devices. These outlets usually have a plastic cap tethered to them, and are usually labeled as being only for DC power, because they are not intended to withstand the heat produced by an electrical cigarette lighter.

The use of cigarette lighter receptacles to supply 12 volt DC power is an example of backward compatibility to a de facto standard. As a power connector, the lighter receptacle is larger, harder to use and less reliable than other DC connectors. There are two prong threaded plugs to stop the plug from falling out due to vibrations.

Cigarette lighter receptacles are in widespread use in many highway vehicles and some boats. Portable cigarette lighter receptacles attached to cables and alligator clips for connection directly to car batteries are available for temporary use. In newer vehicles, one or more USB connectors may also be provided. Plus in newer cars, the power output from the lighter plug is so reliable that it can charge laptops, without any voltage problems.

Standardized 12 volt DC automobile plugs are defined in the United States by UL Standard 2089 regarding vehicle battery adapters. This standard covers plugs and cord sets that insert into cigarette lighter receptacles. In Europe, 12 volt plugs and sockets are not specially regulated and do not require approvals for the CE mark.

The male plug is sometimes used to feed power into a vehicle to recharge its battery because it usually has no regulatory circuitry between the outlet and the car battery. For instance, portable solar battery maintainers generally connect to a vehicle's battery in this manner. Trickle chargers also sometimes connect in this way, eliminating the need to leave a vehicle's hood open, as well as eliminating the possibility of reversed polarity. Most cars nowadays are designed with a battery-negative earthing system and therefore have a +12V positive power distribution. In such a case, the centre pin of a plug/socket will be +12V DC and the outer casing 0V. While polarity is not an issue for a cigarette lighter, it is prudent to verify the correct matching of polarities when connecting other kinds of accessories.

In some car models, when the ignition key is removed, the cigarette lighter outlet is not powered and charging is not possible, though modification of the fuse box may allow unlocking continuous power output, by establishing a parallel circuit from a continuously powered fuse slot through a "piggyback" connector.

Since the cigarette lighter socket was originally designed only to heat a cigarette lighter, repurposing these sockets as generic power connectors can lead to many problems. In addition to the issues with partially-compatible physical dimensions, the plugs can vibrate out of the socket under normal driving conditions, owing to poor retention. Also, there have been reports of melted plug tips due to poor contact and heat generation from ohmic resistance.

A second problem is that nominally "twelve-volt" power in cars fluctuates widely. The outlet is connected directly to the electrical system of the car. The actual voltage, matching the car battery's voltage, will be approximately 12.5 volts when dormant (less in cold conditions), approximately 14.5 volts when the engine and the alternator/generator are operating (more when cold), and may briefly drop as low as 5–6 volts during engine start due to the high temporary battery current usage. When used, DC to DC converters will usually compensate for small fluctuations, but reliable power may not be available without an independent battery-powered uninterruptible power supply.

Rarely, more extreme cases of voltage fluctuation can occur when the car battery is disconnected while the engine is running, or when the car receives a jump start. When the battery is disconnected while the engine is running, its voltage smoothing effect (similar to capacitors) is unavailable and a load dump transient can produce very high voltages as the built-in voltage regulator has been controlling the alternator field current to charge the vehicle battery and although it will attempt to reduce the field current to keep the output voltage constant, the field winding is highly inductive and setting the current to its new value takes several hundred milliseconds, during which the alternator output voltage will exceed its intended value. The load dump transient may also ruin the diodes in the alternator by exceeding their breakdown voltage. A car receiving a jump start from a truck may be subject to a 24 V electrical system used in some vehicles. Also, a "double battery jump-start" is performed by some tow truck drivers in cold climates.

Equipment intended to be powered by the receptacle needs to account for intermittent contact, and voltages outside the nominal 12 V DC, such as maximum voltage 9–16 V continuously, or maximum voltage of 20 V lasting 1 hour, 24 V lasting 1 minute, and 40 V lasting 400 ms. An example of protection component ratings tolerance is +50 to −60 V DC. Robust equipment must tolerate temperatures varying between −40 and +85 °C (−40 and 185 °F), plus possible high humidity and condensation of water.

== See also ==
- Automobile accessory power
- EmPower (aircraft power adapter)
- Inductive charging
- ISO 4165: Road vehicles – Electrical connections – Double-pole connection
