= MagSafe =

Magnetic laptop charger

MagSafe Connector

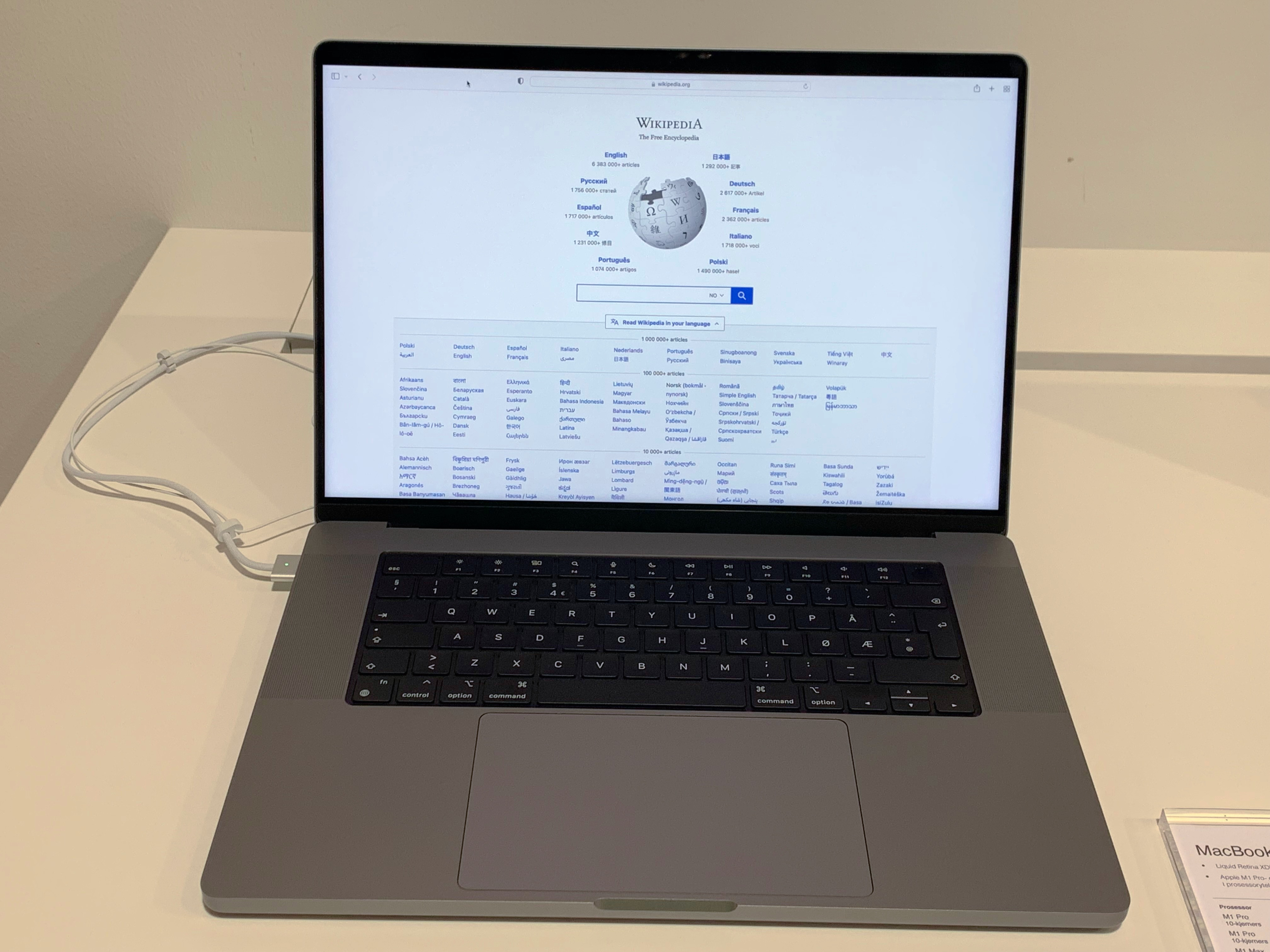
- MagSafe 3 connector in use on a MacBook Pro (2021)
- Type: Computer power connector

Production history
- Designer: Apple Inc.
- Manufacturer: Apple Inc.
- Produced: 2006–present
- Superseded: Apple Power Connector (2005)

General specifications
- Hot pluggable: Yes
- External: Yes
- Pins: 5

Pinout
- Male MagSafe 1 connector, front view
| Pin 1 | | GND (0 V) |
| Pin 2 | | V+ (14.5 / 16.5 / 18.5 / 20 V DC) |
| Pin 3 | | Charge control pin |
| Pin 4 | | V+ (14.5 / 16.5 / 18.5 / 20 V DC) |
| Pin 5 | | GND (0 V) |
- Gray area indicates magnetic connector shroud

MagSafe is a series of proprietary magnetically attached power connectors developed by Apple Inc. for its MacBook Air and MacBook Pro laptops.

The MagSafe power connector was introduced on January 10, 2006, in conjunction with the MacBook Pro, the first Intel-based Mac laptop, at the Macworld Expo. A MagSafe connector is held in place magnetically so that if it is tugged (for example, by someone tripping over the cable), it will be pulled out of the port without damaging the connector or the port, and without pulling the computer off its surface. A thinner and wider version, called MagSafe 2, was introduced in 2012. It was discontinued across Apple's product lines between 2016 and 2019 and replaced with USB-C and USB Power Delivery charging. MagSafe returned to Mac laptops with the introduction of updated MacBook Pro models with MagSafe 3 in 2021.

== History ==
The basic concept of MagSafe is derived from the magnetic power connectors that are part of many deep fryers and Japanese countertop cooking appliances since the early 2000s in order to avoid spilling their dangerously hot contents. MagSafe was introduced on January 10, 2006, in the first-generation MacBook Pro. Apple was granted US Patent No. 7311526 for MagSafe ("Magnetic connector for electronic device", issued in 2007) as MagSafe was deemed to be a sufficient improvement due to the connector being symmetrical and reversible, and the fact that magnets within a connector are arranged in opposing polarities for improved coupling strength.

Apple phased out the original MagSafe and MagSafe 2 with the release of the 12-inch MacBook and the 2016 MacBook Pro which both used only USB-C for charging. The 2017 MacBook Air, the last Mac laptop with MagSafe before 2021, was discontinued on July 9, 2019.

The MagSafe connector returned in 2021 as "MagSafe 3" with the introduction of updated 14-inch and 16-inch MacBook Pro models.

Apple also uses the MagSafe name for a wireless power transfer and accessory-attachment feature for the iPhone based on the Qi standard. MagSafe was introduced with the iPhone 12 and 12 Pro.

== Features ==
=== MagSafe ===
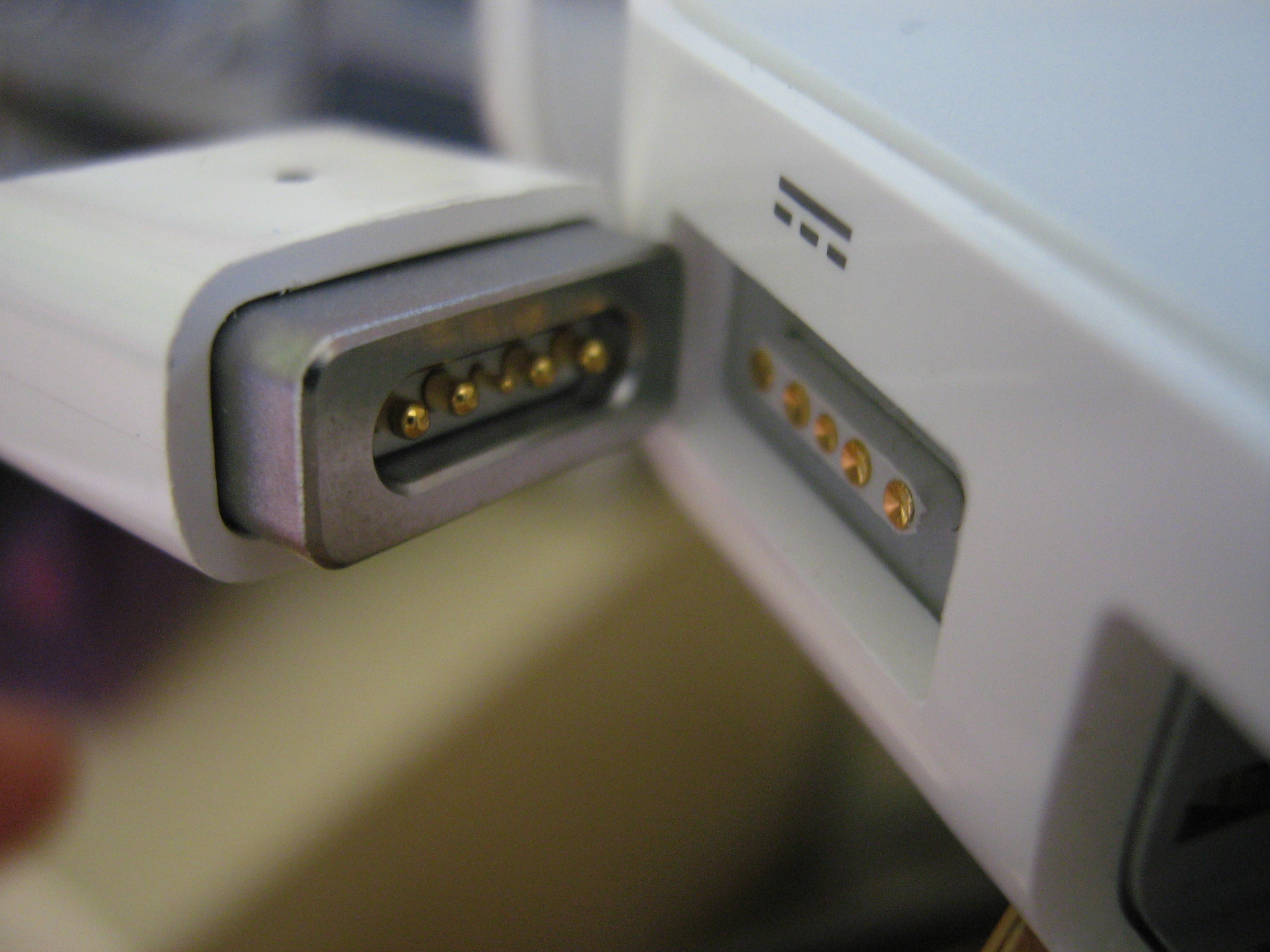
Close-up of the first-generation MagSafe connector

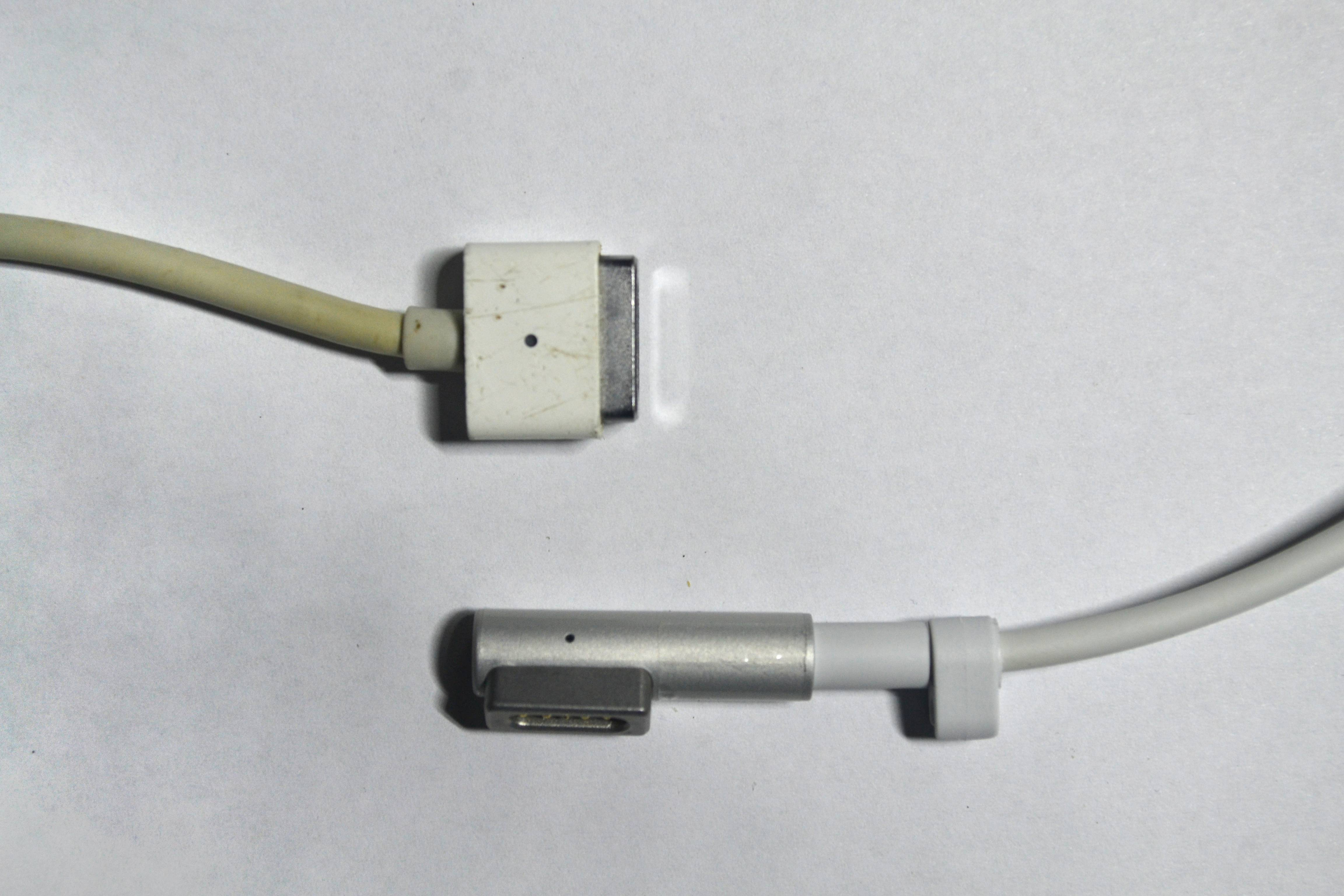
T-shaped and L-shaped first-generation MagSafe connectors

The first generation MagSafe (also referred to as MagSafe 1 after the introduction of MagSafe 2) has connector pins that are designed so the rectangular connector can be inserted in either orientation. Originally the connector was T-shaped, with the cable directed straight out; later it became L-shaped, with the cable directed along the side of the computer, but still capable of being inserted in either orientation, unless simultaneous use of neighboring ports such as USB required directing the cable toward the rear. LEDs on both the top and bottom of the connector show green if the computer battery is fully charged and amber or red if the battery is charging. MagSafe can be found on the MacBook (2006–2011), MacBook Pro (2006 through mid-2012, non-Retina) and MacBook Air (2008–2011) notebook computers. The Apple LED Cinema Display and Thunderbolt Display include built-in MagSafe chargers.

The MacBook and the 13-inch MacBook Pro use a 60 W MagSafe charger, whereas the 15- and 17-inch MacBook Pro use an 85 W version. The MacBook Air used a lower-powered 45 W version. According to Apple, an adapter with a higher wattage than that originally provided may be used without problems.

Apple formerly offered a "MagSafe Airline Adapter" for use on airplanes with EmPower Classic outlets. The MagSafe Airline Adapter had a DC input (instead of AC like the original MagSafe chargers) and would power the computer but would not charge the battery.

=== MagSafe 2 ===
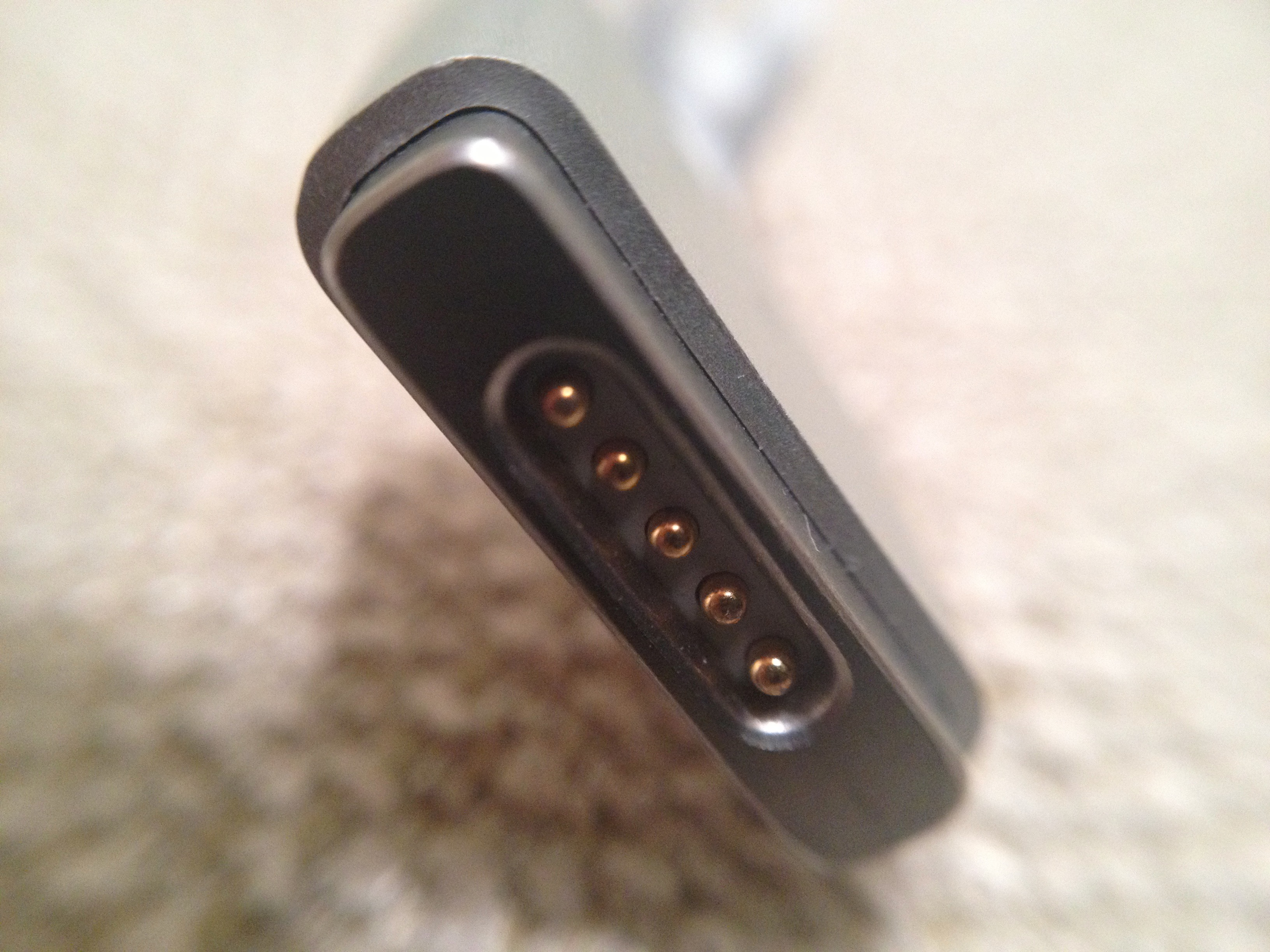
Close-up of the MagSafe 2 connector

MagSafe 2 was introduced on the MacBook Air and MacBook Pro with Retina Display at the 2012 Worldwide Developers Conference on June 11, 2012. It was made thinner to fit the thinner laptops, and also wider to preserve magnetic grip force. It also returns to the T-shaped design that points straight out, rather than the L-shape that runs along the side of the machine. MagSafe 2 can be found on the MacBook Pro (2012–2015 Retina models) and MacBook Air (2012–2017) notebook computers.

The resulting shape is incompatible with the older MagSafe connector; Apple released a MagSafe to MagSafe 2 adapter that was also bundled with the Thunderbolt Display, which used the original MagSafe connector.

=== MagSafe 3 ===
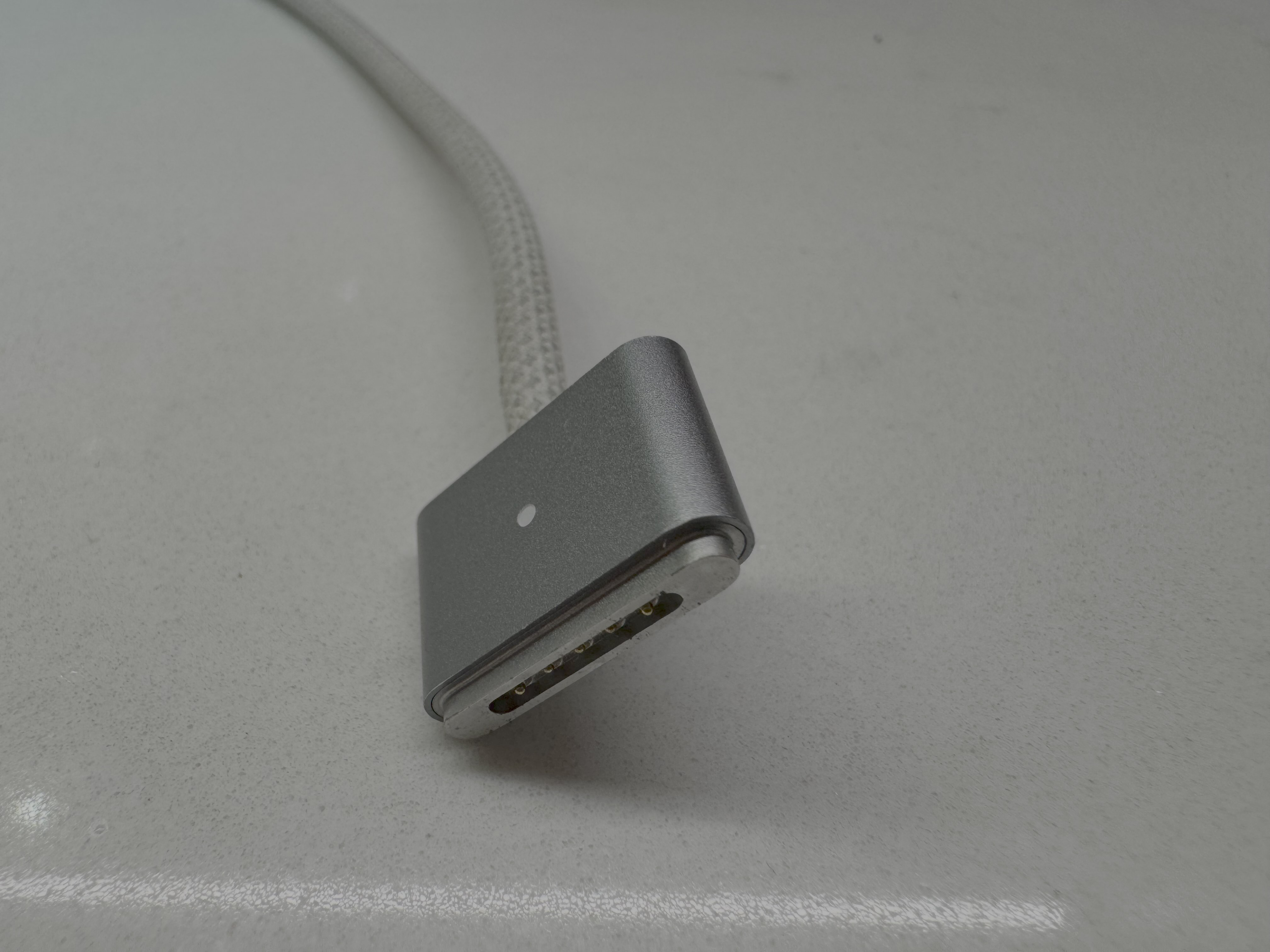
Close-up of the MagSafe 3 connector

On October 18, 2021, Apple announced the M1 Pro and M1 Max 14-inch and 16-inch MacBook Pro models with MagSafe 3. MagSafe 3 is slimmer than its predecessor and connects to a power supply using a removable cable with a USB-C end. It supports up to 140 W power delivery on the 16-inch MacBook Pro with its bundled 140 W GaN power adapter which supports USB Power Delivery 3.1.

In June 2022, Apple announced the M2 MacBook Air with MagSafe 3, and new braided-jacket cables available in three colorways matching the available MacBook Air case colors.

== Pinout ==
The MagSafe connector pins allow for the adapter to be inserted in either orientation. The first and second pins on each side of the central pin have continuity with their mirror pins.

- In the first-generation connector, the inner large pins are V+ (14.5 / 16.5 / 18.5 / 20 V DC). Measuring with no load will give 6.86 V DC for MagSafe and about 3 V DC for MagSafe 2; the full voltage is provided after a ~40 kilohm (kΩ) load is applied for one second.
- The outer large pins are ground.
- The central pin is used for communication between the computer and the power adapter following the 1-Wire protocol. The computer makes use of this to retrieve information about the power adapter and to change the color of the LEDs on the power adapter's connector. The Apple MagSafe power adapter's 1-Wire communication chip is located inside the MagSafe connector itself; the cable does not carry the data line to the power adapter enclosure.
- The maximum voltage supplied is as follows:
  - 14.5 V DC for the 45 W units supplied with MacBook Air
  - 16.5 V DC for the 60 W units supplied with MacBook and 13" MacBook Pro
  - 18.5 V DC for the 85 W units supplied with 15" and 17" MacBook Pro
  - 20 V DC for the 85 W units supplied with 15" MacBook Pro Retina
  - 28 V DC for the 140 W units supplied with the 16" MacBook Pro

The rectangular metal shroud surrounding the pins acts as shielding for the electrical pins and a ferrous attractor for the magnet in the laptop.

== Third-party products ==
Apple does not license the MagSafe connector to third parties, but manufacturers have devised a workaround: their MagSafe-compatible products use the actual connector from Apple's AC adapter, grafted onto their own products. Since this uses an actual Apple product, purchased legally, manufacturers believe that no licensing agreements are needed (a principle referred to as the first sale doctrine) and no patent was violated. However, in 2010 Apple sued one such manufacturer, Sanho Corporation, for selling its very popular HyperMac battery extension products which Apple claimed violated their patents. Sanho has since ceased to sell their connector cable for the HyperMac series of external batteries.

Fake MagSafe 2 chargers were offered for sale on sites such as Amazon. These chargers were sometimes unsafe or had false specifications in their labelling or malfunctioned: e.g. the LEDs on the connector did not show the correct color.

== Defects ==
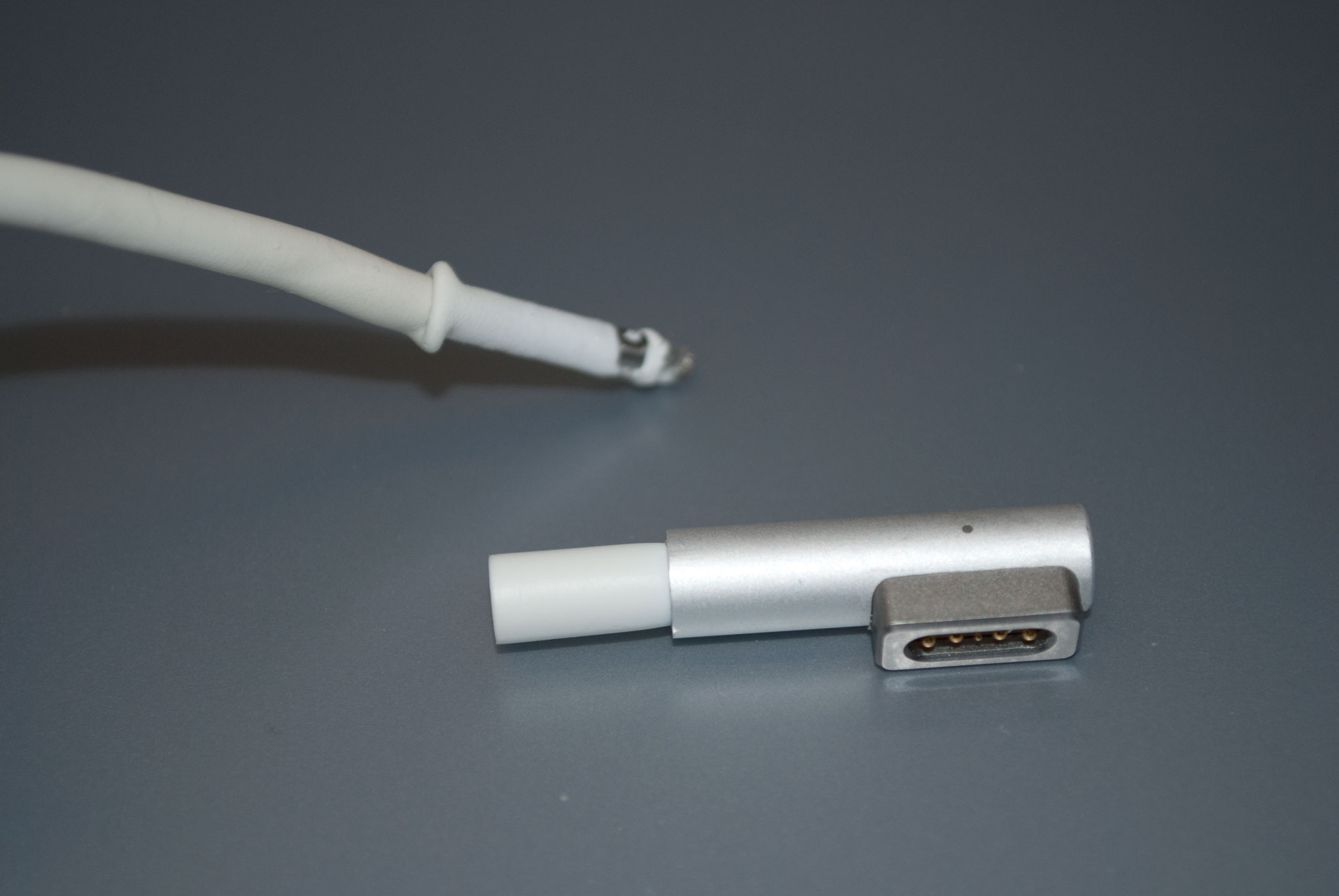
L-shaped MagSafe connector, broken off its power cord

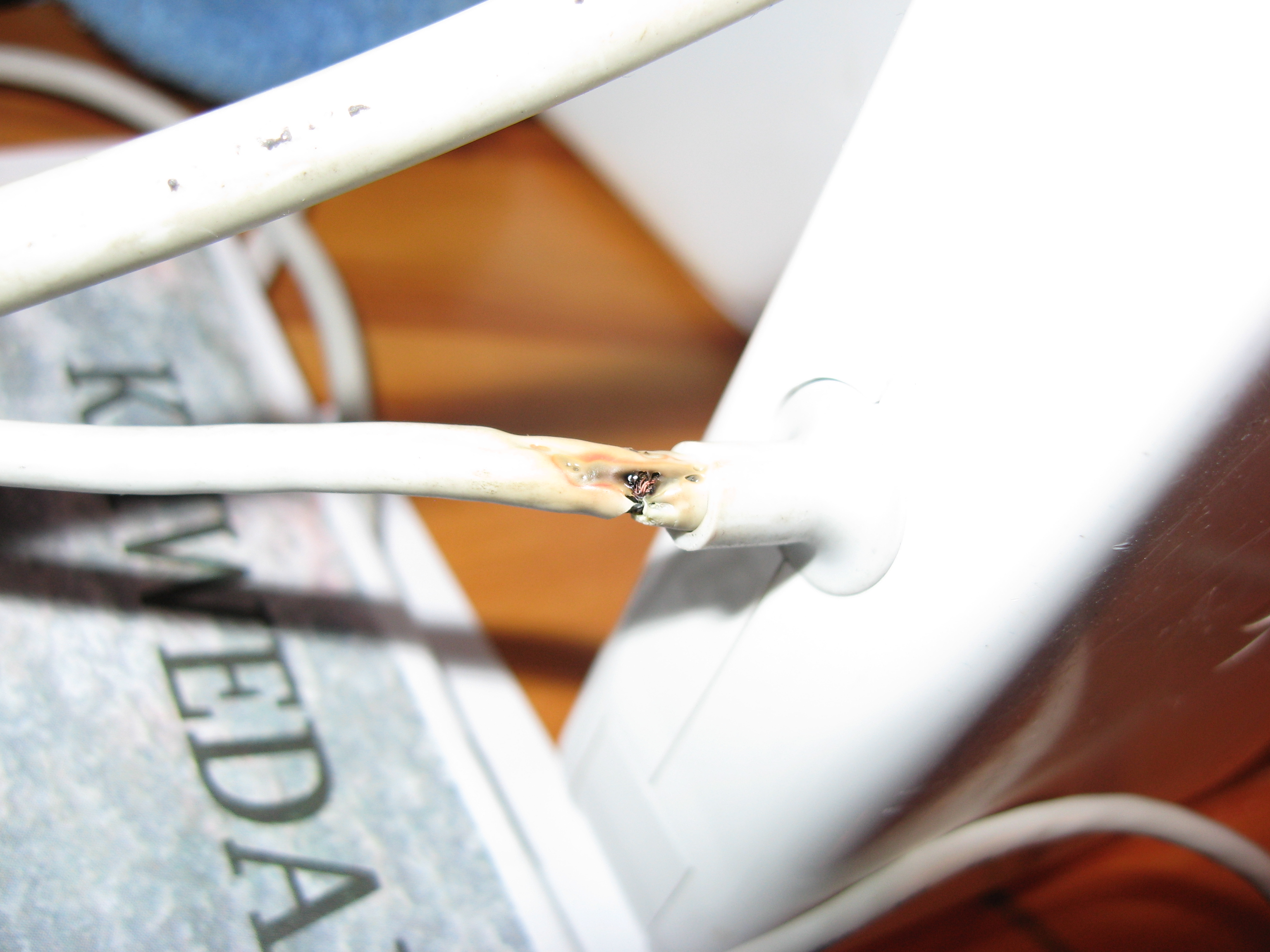
MagSafe with both frayed wires and melted casing, as alleged in the 2009 class action lawsuit

Many users reported problems with the quality of the construction of the early MagSafe cords, giving the product low marks on the Apple Store's website. Common complaints included the plug separating from the cord, transformer shorting, and pin springs losing elasticity.

Several methods have been devised to protect the MagSafe from failure, including wrapping the cable with tape or sliding protective plastic around the cable.

In 2008, Apple posted an official response acknowledging problems with MagSafe adapters, which include incomplete circuit connection and adapter's white insulation separating from the magnetic end of the MagSafe connector. Following the release of a Knowledge Base article, a class-action lawsuit was filed on May 1, 2009, in the US District Court for the Northern District of California's San Jose office, alleging that the MagSafe power adapter is prone to frayed wires and overheating, and as such represents a fire hazard.

Apple released a firmware update in October 2010 that it claims resolves this issue. However, the installer for the firmware update will not run on certain older MacBooks, which means that the firmware can not be updated. This, in turn, means that it is not possible to use the new MagSafe power adapter with these MacBooks. However, even as of 2023, Apple still sold power adapters for both MagSafe 1 and MagSafe 2.

In 2011, Apple posted a support document about the strain-relief problems with the MPM-1 ("T")-style MagSafe power cables, and issued a settlement offer for buyers of Apple 60 W or 85 W MagSafe MPM-1 adapter within the first three years of purchase.
