= MacBook Pro =

Line of notebook computers and mobile workstations

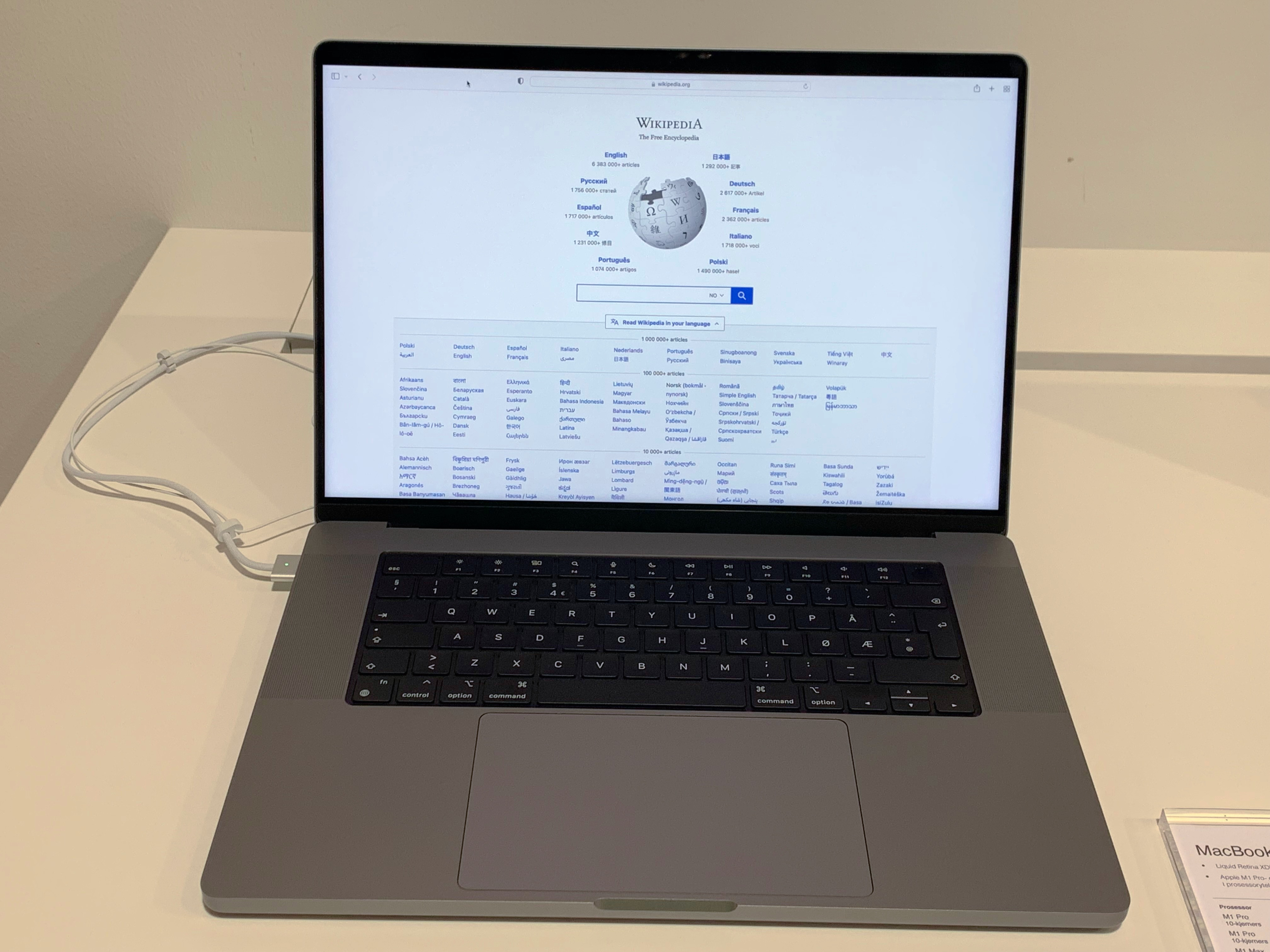
- MacBook Pro (16-inch, 2021) displaying the home page of Wikipedia. This image does not show the notch at the top of the screen.
- Developer: Apple
- Manufacturer: Foxconn; Pegatron; Quanta Computer
- Product family: MacBook
- Type: Laptop
- Released: February 14, 2006; 20 years ago
- Operating system: macOS
- System on a chip: Apple M series
- CPU: Intel Core: Duo, 2 Duo, i5, i7, i9 (discontinued, 2006–2021)
- Predecessor: PowerBook
- Related: 13-inch MacBook; 12-inch MacBook; MacBook Air; MacBook Neo
- Website: apple.com/macbook-pro

The MacBook Pro is a line of Mac-branded laptop computers developed and manufactured by Apple. Introduced in 2006, it is the high-end model of the MacBook family, sitting above the ultra-portable MacBook Air, the entry-level MacBook Neo, and previously the mid-range MacBook line. As of June 2026, it is currently sold with 14-and-16-inch (360 and 410 mm) screens, all using Apple M-series chips. Before the introduction of Apple silicon in 2020, all MacBook Pro models used Intel chips. The MacBook Pro is the first laptop made by Apple to use the Apple–Intel architecture, replacing the earlier PowerBook line for professional users. It is also the first Apple laptop to use the term "MacBook", which later replaced the earlier iBook line for the non-professional users. The MacBook Pro primarily runs the macOS operating system.

== Overview ==
The first MacBook Pro used a similar design to the PowerBook G4, but replaced the PowerPC G4 chips with Intel Core Duo processors, added an iSight webcam, and introduced the MagSafe power connector. The 15-inch (380 mm) model was announced in January 2006 followed by the 17-inch (430 mm) model in April. Later revisions added Intel Core 2 Duo processors and LED-backlit displays.

The unibody 15-inch (380 mm) model debuted in October 2008, with a 17-inch (430 mm) variant added in January 2009. In June 2009, a 13-inch (330 mm) variant was added to the MacBook Pro lineup, replacing the aluminum unibody MacBook. The "unibody" MacBook Pros are named as such because the case is machined from a single piece of aluminum. It has a thinner flush display than its predecessors, a redesigned trackpad whose entire surface acts as a single clickable button, and a redesigned keyboard. Updates brought Intel Core i5 and i7 processors, and introduced Intel's Thunderbolt connector.

The Retina MacBook Pro was released in 2012: the 15-inch (380 mm) in June and a 13-inch (330 mm) model in October. It is thinner than its predecessor, made solid-state storage (SSD) standard, added HDMI, and included a high-resolution Retina display. It eliminated Ethernet, FireWire ports and the optical drive.

The Touch Bar MacBook Pro, released in October 2016, adopted USB-C for all data ports and power and included a shallower "butterfly"-mechanism keyboard. On all but the base model, the function keys were replaced with an OLED touchscreen strip called the "Touch Bar" with a Touch ID sensor integrated into the power button.

In November 2019, a revision to the Touch Bar MacBook Pro introduced the Magic Keyboard, which uses a scissor-switch mechanism. The initial 16-inch model with a screen set in narrower bezels was followed by a 13-inch model in May 2020. This revision also modified the Touch Bar, as users were complaining about the Esc key disappearing and not being able to exit a computer window. Apple reinstated the physical ESC key as a result, as was standard before Touch Bar Macs.

Another revision to the Touch Bar MacBook Pro was released in November 2020; it is the first MacBook Pro to feature an Apple-designed system on a chip, the Apple M1. In 2022, the Touch Bar MacBook Pro was updated to feature an Apple M2 chip.

The 14-and-16-inch (360 and 410 mm) MacBook Pros were released in October 2021. Powered by either M1 Pro or M1 Max chips, they are the first to be available only with an Apple silicon system on a chip. These models re-introduced MagSafe, function keys, HDMI, an SD card reader, and some other elements that had been removed from the Touch Bar MacBook Pro.

Alongside the redesigned M2 MacBook Air, Apple refreshed the 14-and-16-inch (360 and 410 mm) MacBook Pros powered by either the M2 Pro or M2 Max chip in January 2023. Later that year, in November 2023, Apple refreshed the 14- and 16-inch MacBook Pros with the M3 Pro and M3 Max chips. Apple also released a base model 14-inch (360 mm) MacBook Pro powered by the Apple M3 chip to replace the discontinued base model 13-inch (330 mm) Touch Bar MacBook Pro.

In November 2026, Apple released the 14-and-16-inch (360 and 410 mm) MacBook Pro models with the Apple M5 Pro and M5 Max chips, the PROLED XDR display, and support for touchscreen input.

== Intel-based ==
=== Aluminum (2006–2008) ===
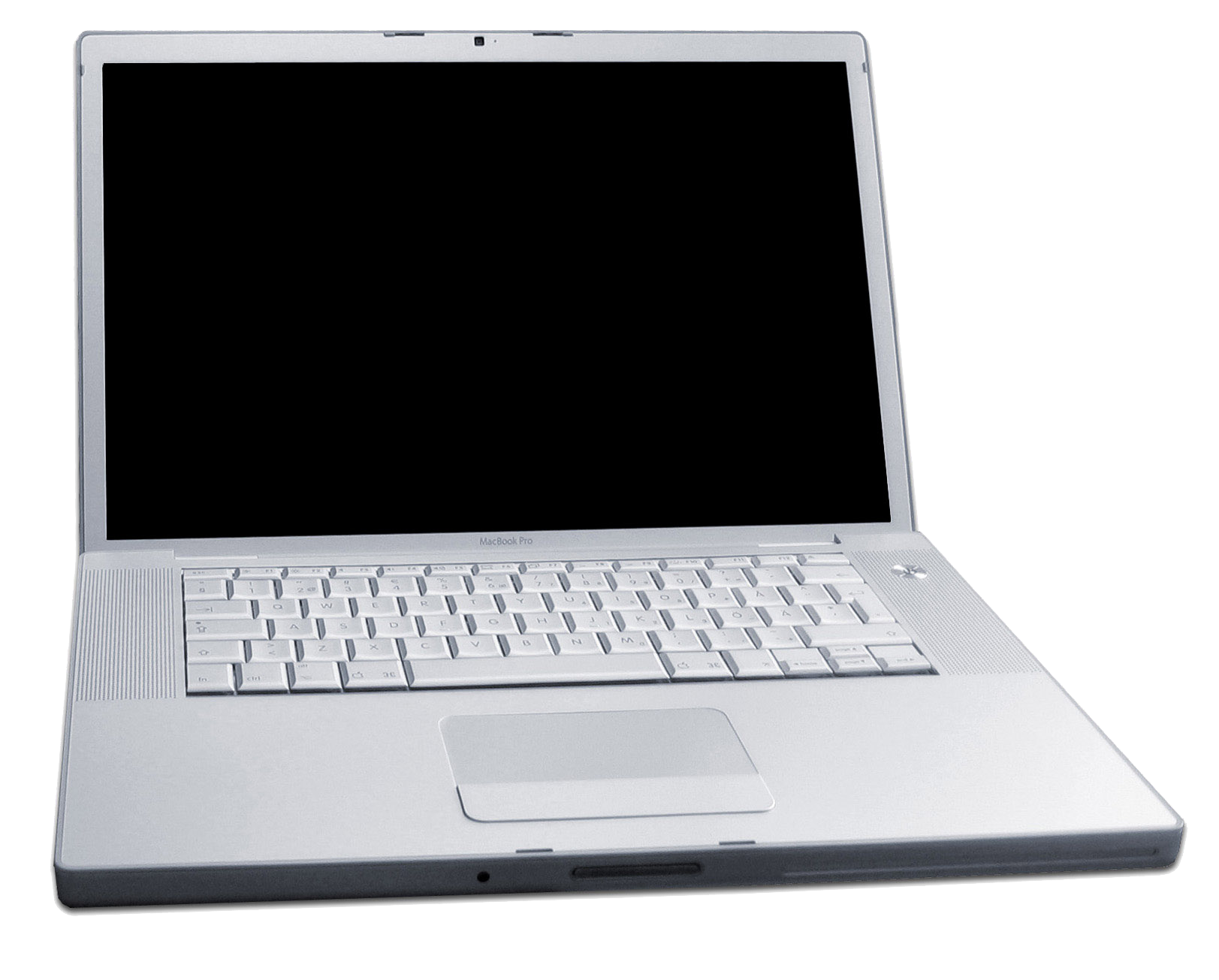
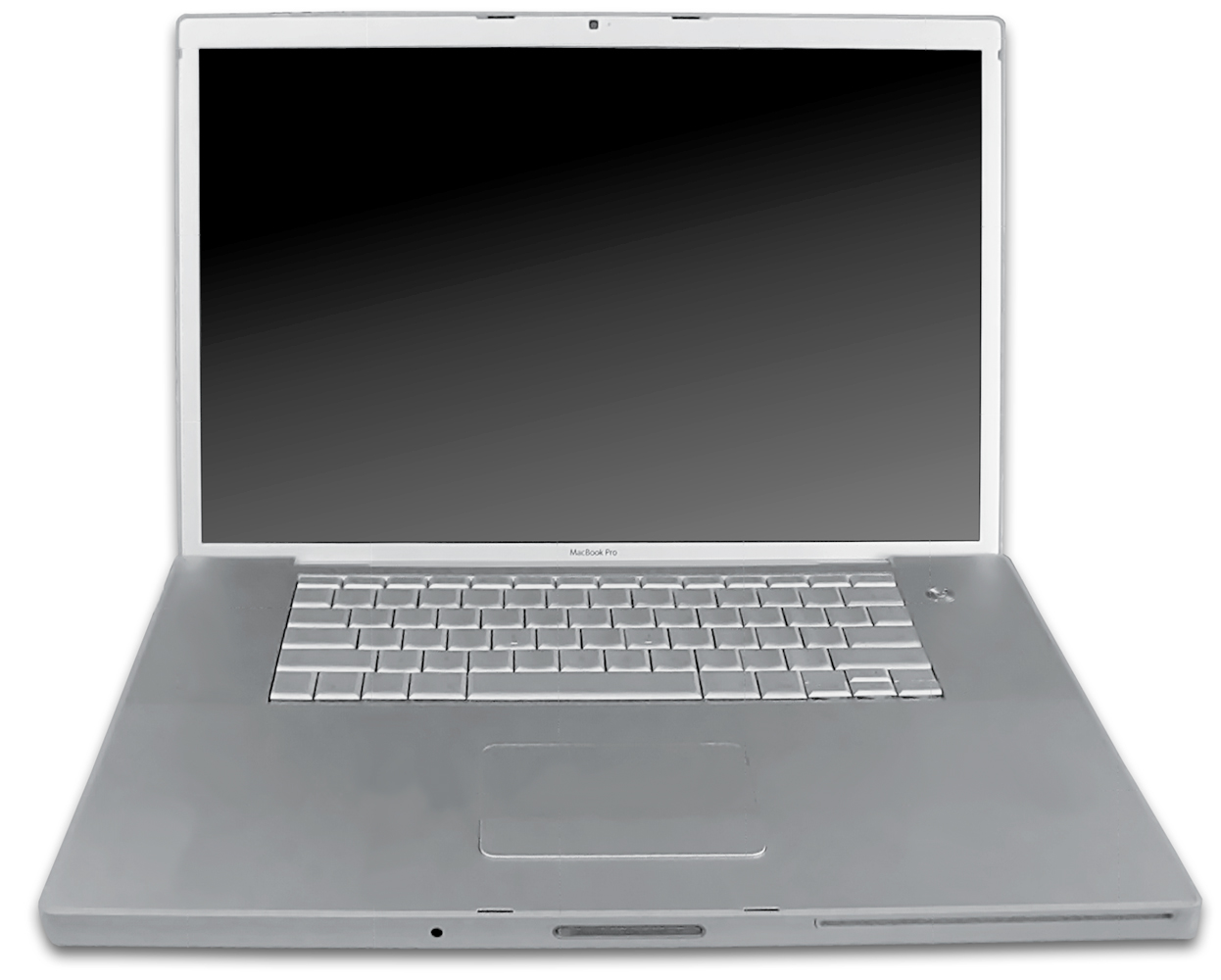
The 15-and-17-inch (380 and 430 mm) aluminum MacBook Pros

The original MacBook Pro used the design of the PowerBook G4, but replaced the PowerPC G4 chips with Intel Core Duo processors, added a built-in iSight camera, and introduced the MagSafe power connector. The optical drive was shrunk to fit into the slimmer MacBook Pro; it runs slower than the optical drive in the PowerBook G4 and cannot write to dual-layer DVDs. The 15-inch (380 mm) model was announced in January 2006, and the 17-inch (430 mm) model in April. In 2007, the 15-inch (380 mm) model added Core 2 Duo "Merom" processors and LED-backlit displays, with the same done to the 17-inch (430 mm) in 2008. The 2007 revision received new Nvidia GeForce 8600M GT video cards and the 2008 revision upgraded the processors to "Penryn" cores while adding multi-touch capabilities to the trackpad.

Both the original 15-and-17-inch (380 and 430 mm) model MacBook Pro computers come with ExpressCard/34 slots, which replace the PC Card slots found in the PowerBook G4. Initial first-generation 15-inch models retain the two USB 2.0 ports and a FireWire 400 port but drop the FireWire 800, until it was restored in a later revision. The 17-inch (430 mm) models have an additional USB 2.0 port, as well as the FireWire 800 port missing from the initial 15-inch (380 mm) models. All models now included 802.11a/b/g. Later models include support for the draft 2.0 specification of 802.11n and Bluetooth 2.1.

The original case design was discontinued on October 14, 2008, for the 15-inch (380 mm), and January 6, 2009, for the 17-inch (430 mm).

Models of the 15-inch (380 mm) MacBook Pro built from 2007 to early 2008 (2007 through late 2008 for the 17-inch (430 mm)) using the GeForce 8600M GT GPU reportedly exhibited failures in which the GPU die would detach from the chip carrier, or the chip would detach from the logic board. Apple initially ignored reports, before admitting to the fault and replacing logic boards free of charge for up to four years after the purchase date. Nvidia also confirmed the issue, and previously manufactured replacement GPUs, which some users have replaced themselves.

=== Unibody (2008–2012) ===
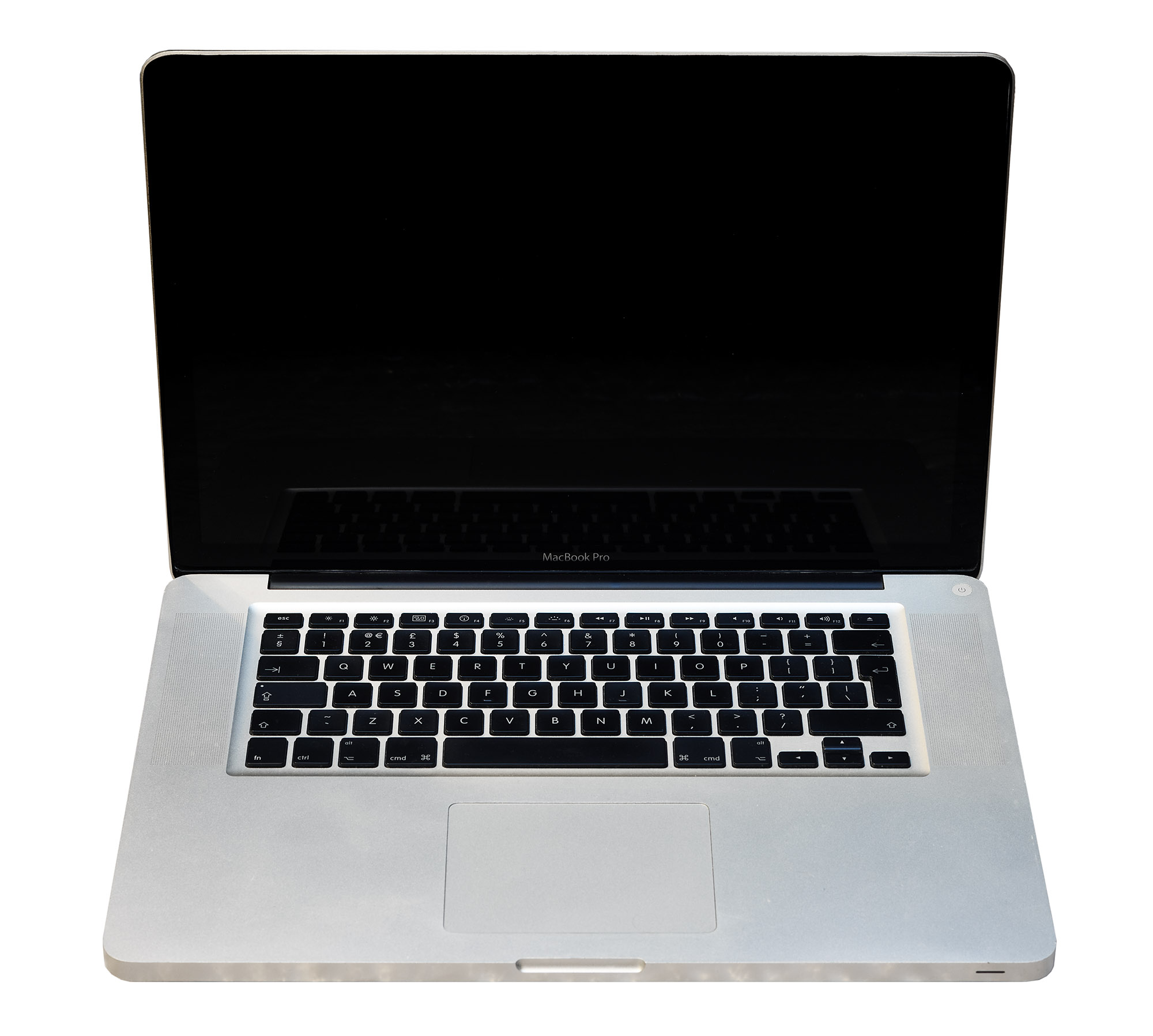
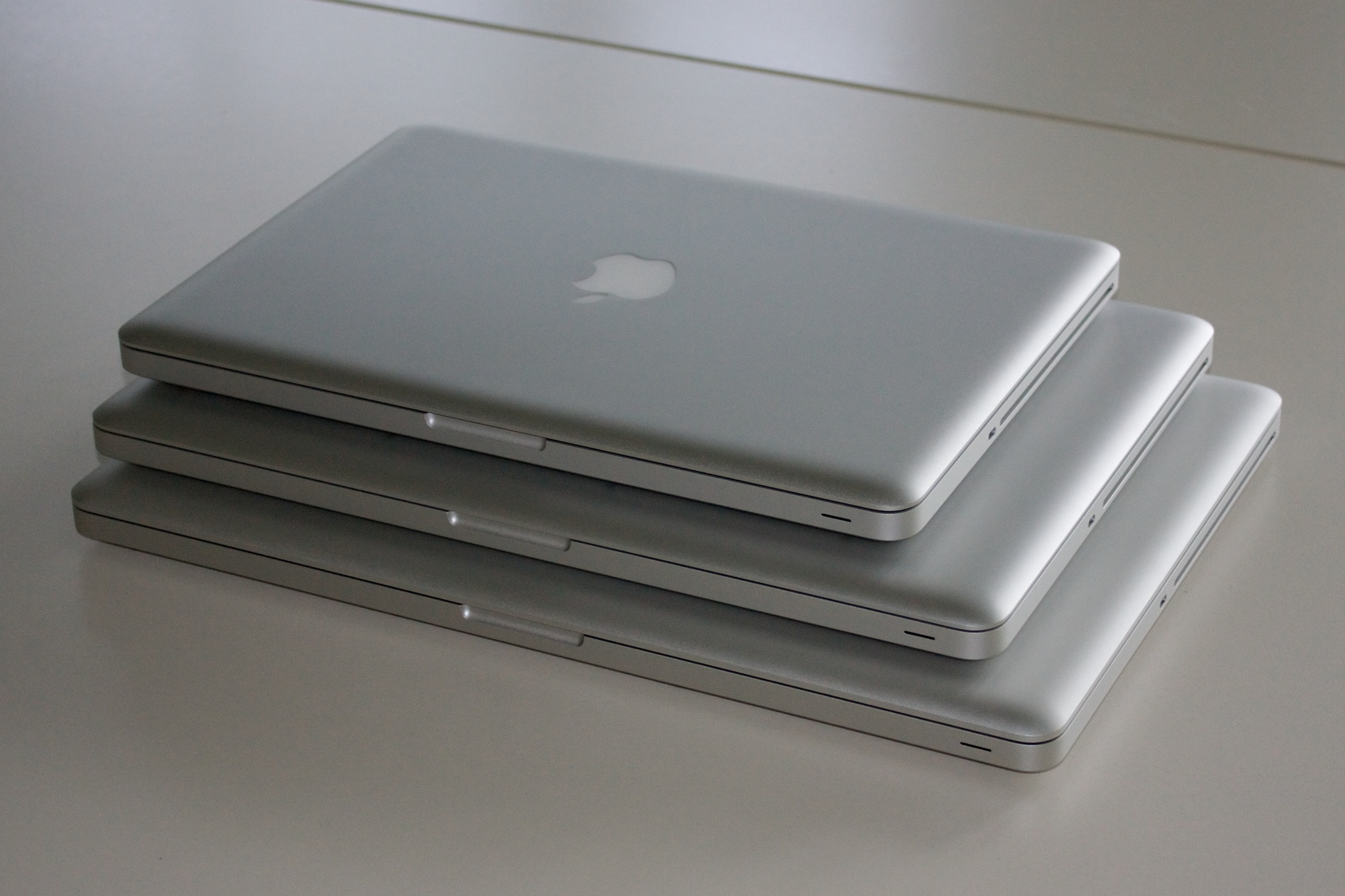
The 15-inch (380 mm) unibody and a size comparison of the unibody line

On October 14, 2008, in a press event at company headquarters, Apple officials announced a new 15-inch (380 mm) MacBook Pro featuring a "precision aluminum unibody enclosure" and tapered sides similar to those of the MacBook Air. Designers had shifted the MacBook Pro's ports to the left side of the case, and moved the optical disc drive slot from the front to the right side, similar to the Polycarbonate MacBook. The new MacBook Pro computers had two video cards that the user could switch between: the Nvidia GeForce 9600M GT with either 256 or 512 MB of dedicated memory and a GeForce 9400M with 256 MB of shared system memory. The FireWire 400 port was removed. The DVI port was replaced with a Mini DisplayPort. The original unibody MacBook Pro came with a user-removable battery; Apple claimed five hours of use, with one reviewer reporting results closer to four hours on a continuous video battery stress test. Apple said that the battery would hold 80% of its charge after 300 recharges.

The unibody-construction MacBook Pro largely follows the styling of the original aluminum iMac and the MacBook Air and is slightly thinner than its predecessor, albeit wider and deeper due to the widescreen display. The screen is high-gloss, covered by an edge-to-edge reflective glass finish, while an anti-glare matte option is available in the 15-and-17-inch (380 and 430 mm) models in which the glass panel is removed. The entire trackpad is usable and acts as a clickable button. The trackpad is also larger than that of the aluminum models, giving more room for scrolling and multi-touch gestures. When the line was updated in April 2010, inertial scrolling was added, making the scrolling experience much like that of the iPhone and iPad. The keys, which are still backlit, are now identical to those of Apple's now-standard sunken keyboard with separated black keys. The mechanical screen release latch from the non-unibody models was replaced with a magnetic one.

During the MacWorld Expo keynote on January 6, 2009, Phil Schiller announced a 17-inch (430 mm) MacBook Pro with unibody construction. This version diverged from its 15-inch (380 mm) sibling with an anti-glare "matte" screen option (with the glossy finish standard) and a non user-removable lithium polymer battery. Instead of traditional round cells inside the casing, the lithium-ion polymer batteries are shaped and fitted into each notebook to maximally utilize space. Adaptive charging, which uses a chip to optimize the charge flow to reduce wear and tear, extends the battery's overall life. Battery life for the 17-inch (430 mm) version is quoted at eight hours, with 80 percent of this charge remaining after 1,000 charge-discharge cycles.

At Apple's Worldwide Developers Conference (WWDC) on June 8, 2009, it was announced that the 13-inch (330 mm) unibody MacBook would be upgraded and re-branded as a MacBook Pro, leaving only the white polycarbonate MacBook in the MacBook line. It was also announced that the entire MacBook Pro line would use the non-user-removable battery first introduced in the 17-inch (430 mm) MacBook Pro. The updated 13-and-15-inch (330 and 380 mm) MacBook Pro would each have up to a claimed seven hours of battery life, while the 17-inch (430 mm) would keep its eight-hour capacity. Some sources even reported up to eight hours of battery life for the 13- and 15-inch MacBook Pro computers during casual use, while others reported around six hours. Like the 17-inch (430 mm) MacBook Pro, Apple claims that they will last around 1,000 charging cycles while still containing 80% of their capacity. Graphics card options stayed the same from the previous release, although the 13-inch (330 mm) and the base model 15-inch (380 mm) came with only the GeForce 9400M GPU. The screens were also improved, gaining a claimed 60 percent greater color gamut. All of the mid-2009 models also include a FireWire 800 port and all except the 17-inch (430 mm) models would receive an SD card slot. The 17-inch (430 mm) model would retain its ExpressCard/34 slot. For the 13-inch (330 mm) MacBook Pro, the Kensington lock slot was moved to the right side of the chassis. In August 2009, Apple extended the "matte" anti-glare display option to the 15-inch MacBook Pro.

On April 13, 2010, Intel Core i5 and Core i7 processors were introduced in the 15-and-17-inch (380 and 430 mm) models, while the 13-inch (330 mm) retained the Core 2 Duo with a speed increase. The MagSafe connector on the power adapter bundled with the computer was redesigned to a barrel shape, and a high-resolution display (of 1680 × 1050) was announced as an option for the 15-inch (380 mm) models. The 13-inch (330 mm) gained an integrated Nvidia GeForce 320M graphics chip with 256 MB of shared memory, while the 15-and-17-inch (380 and 430 mm) models were upgraded to the GeForce GT 330M, with either 256 or 512 MB of dedicated memory. The 15-and-17-inch (380 and 430 mm) models also have an integrated Intel GPU that is built into the Core i5 and i7 processors. The 15-inch (380 mm) model also gained 0.1 pounds (45 g). Save for a third USB 2.0 slot, all the ports on the 17-inch (430 mm) MacBook Pro are the same in type and number as on the 15-inch (380 mm) version. All models came with 4 GB of system memory that was upgradeable to 8 GB. Battery life was also extended further in this update, to an estimated 10 hours for the 13-inch (330 mm) and eight to nine hours on the 15-and-17-inch (380 and 430 mm) MacBook Pro computers. This was achieved through both greater power efficiency and adding more battery capacity. One reviewer reported about six hours of battery life through a continuous video battery stress test in the 15-inch (380 mm) and another, who called the battery life "unbeatable", reported nearer to eight hours in the 13-inch (330 mm) through their "highly demanding battery drain test".

Thunderbolt technology, Sandy Bridge dual-core Intel Core i5 and i7 (on the 13-inch (330 mm) model) or quad-core i7 (on the 15-and-17-inch (380 and 430 mm) models) processors, and a high-definition FaceTime camera were added on February 24, 2011. Intel HD Graphics 3000 come integrated with the CPU, while the 15-and-17-inch (380 and 430 mm) models also utilize AMD Radeon HD 6490M and Radeon HD 6750M graphics cards. Later editions of these models, following the release of OS X Lion, replaced the Exposé (F3) key with a Mission Control key, and the Dashboard (F4) key with a Launchpad key. The chassis bottoms are also engraved differently from the 2010 models. The Thunderbolt serial bus platform can achieve speeds of up to 10 Gbit/s, which is up to twice as fast as the USB 3.0 specification, 20 times faster than the USB 2.0 specification, and up to 12 times faster than FireWire 800. Apple communicated that Thunderbolt could be used to drive displays or to transfer large quantities of data in a short amount of time.

On June 11, 2012, Apple announced upgraded Mac notebooks at the Worldwide Developers Conference (WWDC) in San Francisco. The 2012 MacBook Pro models have Ivy Bridge processors and USB 3.0 ports, and the default RAM on premium models was increased to 8 GB. Following this announcement, the 17-inch (430 mm) model was discontinued. After a media event on October 22, 2013, Apple discontinued the 15-inch (380 mm) non-Retina MacBook Pro, but continued selling the 2.5 GHz 13-inch (330 mm) model.

Apple discontinued the 13-inch (330 mm) non-Retina MacBook Pro on October 27, 2016. Immediately prior to its discontinuation, it was Apple's only MacBook model still on sale that included a built-in optical disc drive and a FireWire port, and the final model that still used a mechanical SATA disk drive and an Ethernet port.

Early and late 2011 models with a GPU—115-and-17-inch (380 and 430 mm)—reportedly suffer from manufacturing problems leading to overheating, graphical problems, and eventually complete GPU and logic board failure. A similar but nonidentical problem affected iMac GPUs, which was later recalled by Apple. The problem was covered by many articles in Mac-focused magazines, starting late 2013 throughout 2014. In August 2014 the law firm Whitfield Bryson & Mason LLP had begun investigating the problem to determine if any legal claim exists. On October 28, 2014, the firm announced that it has filed a class-action lawsuit in a California federal court against Apple. The lawsuit will cover residents residing in both California and Florida who have purchased a 2011 MacBook Pro notebook with an AMD graphics card. The firm is also investigating similar cases across the United States. On February 20, 2015, Apple instituted the "MacBook Pro Repair Extension Program for Video Issues". Archived from the original on March 16, 2015. This "will repair affected MacBook Pro systems, free of charge". The program covered affected MacBook Pro models until December 31, 2016, or four years from original date of sale.

=== Retina (2012–2016) ===
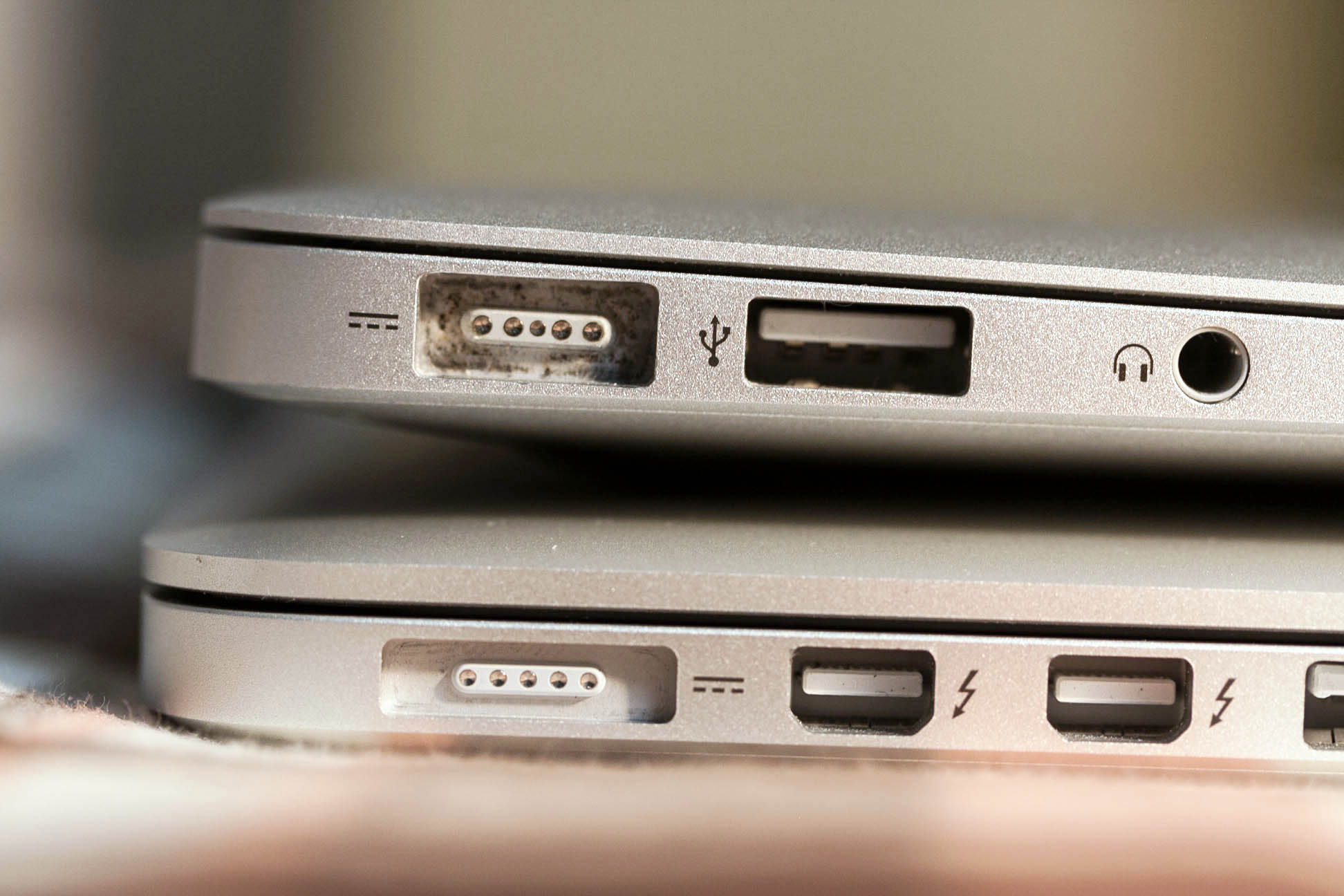
An early model MacBook Air (top) and a Retina MacBook Pro (bottom). The MacBook Pro has a wider MagSafe 2 port and two Thunderbolt ports.

The Retina MacBook Pro was released in 2012, marketed as the "MacBook Pro with Retina display" to differentiate it from the previous model: the 15-inch (380 mm) in June 2012, a 13-and-17-inch (330 and 430 mm) model in October. It made solid-state storage (SSD) standard, upgraded to USB 3.0, added an additional Thunderbolt port, added HDMI, and included a high-resolution Retina display. The 15-inch (380 mm) model is 25% thinner than its predecessor. The model name is no longer placed at the bottom of the screen bezel; instead, it is found on the underside of the chassis, similar to an iOS device and is the first Mac notebook to not have its model name visible during normal use. It eliminated Ethernet, FireWire 800 ports (but Thunderbolt adapters were available for purchase), Kensington lock slot, the battery indicator button and light on the side of the chassis, and the optical drive, being the first professional notebook since the PowerBook 2400c to do so, but brought a new MagSafe port, dubbed the "MagSafe 2". Apple also claims improved speakers and microphones and a new system for cooling the notebook with improved fans.

The Retina models also have fewer user-accessible upgrade or replacement options than the previous generation MacBooks. Unlike the unibody MacBook Pros, the memory is soldered onto the logic board and is therefore not upgradable. The solid state drive is not soldered and can be replaced by users, although it has a proprietary connector and form factor. The battery is glued into place; attempts to remove it may destroy the battery, the trackpad, or both. The entire case uses proprietary pentalobe screws and cannot be disassembled with standard tools. While the battery is glued in, recycling companies have stated that the design is only "mildly inconvenient" and does not hamper the recycling process.

The initial 2012 models include Intel's third-generation Core i7 processors (Ivy Bridge microarchitecture). In February 2013, Apple improved the specs and lowered some of the models' prices. Apple again updated the line on October 22, 2013, to include Intel's fourth-generation Haswell processors with Iris Graphics, and 802.11ac Wi-Fi. The chassis of the 13-inch (330 mm) version was slightly slimmed to 0.71 inches (18 mm) to match the 15-inch (380 mm) model. The lower-end 15-inch (380 mm) model only included integrated graphics while the higher-end model continued to include a discrete Nvidia graphics card in addition to integrated graphics. Support for 4K video output via HDMI was added but limited the maximum number of external displays from three to two.

In 2014, Apple updated the lineup to improve the specs, including more RAM as standard: 8 GB for the 13-inch (330 mm) model and 16 GB for the 15-inch (380 mm).

On March 9, 2015, the 15-inch (380 mm) model was updated with Intel fifth-generation Broadwell-U processors with Iris 6100 graphics, faster flash storage (based on PCIe 2.0 × 4 technology), LPDDR3 RAM with higher clock speeds (upgraded from 1600 MHz to 1866 MHz), increased battery life (extended to 10 hours), and a Force Touch trackpad. On May 19, 2015, 15-inch (380 mm) model added Force Touch and changed the GPU to AMD Radeon R9 M370X, SSD based on PCIe 3.0 × 4 technology, the battery life was extended to nine hours, and the rest of the configuration remained unchanged. The higher-end 15-inch model also added support for dual-cable output to 5120 × 2880 displays. The 15-inch (380 mm) models were released with the same Intel Haswell-H processors and Iris Pro graphics as the 2014 models due to a delay in shipment of newer Broadwell-H quad-core processors.

The 2015 13-inch (330 mm) model was discontinued on June 5, 2017, but Apple continued to sell the 2015 15-inch (380 mm) model until July 12, 2018. The 2015 models are the last MacBook Pro models to have standard USB-A ports, a user-upgradable SSD, and previously a MicroSD card slot and MagSafe (which were reintroduced with the 2021 14-inch and 16-inch MacBook Pro models), as well as an illuminated Apple logo (until the introduction of the PROLED XDR MacBook Pro in October 2026).

In June 2019, Apple announced a worldwide recall for certain 2015 15-inch (380 mm) MacBook Pro computers after receiving at least 26 reports of batteries becoming hot enough to produce smoke and inflict minor burns or property damage. The problem affected some 432,000 computers, mostly sold between September 2015 and February 2017. The company asked customers to stop using their computers until Apple could replace the batteries.

In September 2019, India's Directorate General of Civil Aviation said MacBook Pro computers could dangerously overheat, leading the national carrier Air India to ban the model on its flights.

Final models of the Retina MacBook Pro became unsupported by Apple with the release of macOS Ventura in 2022.

=== Touch Bar (2016–2021) ===
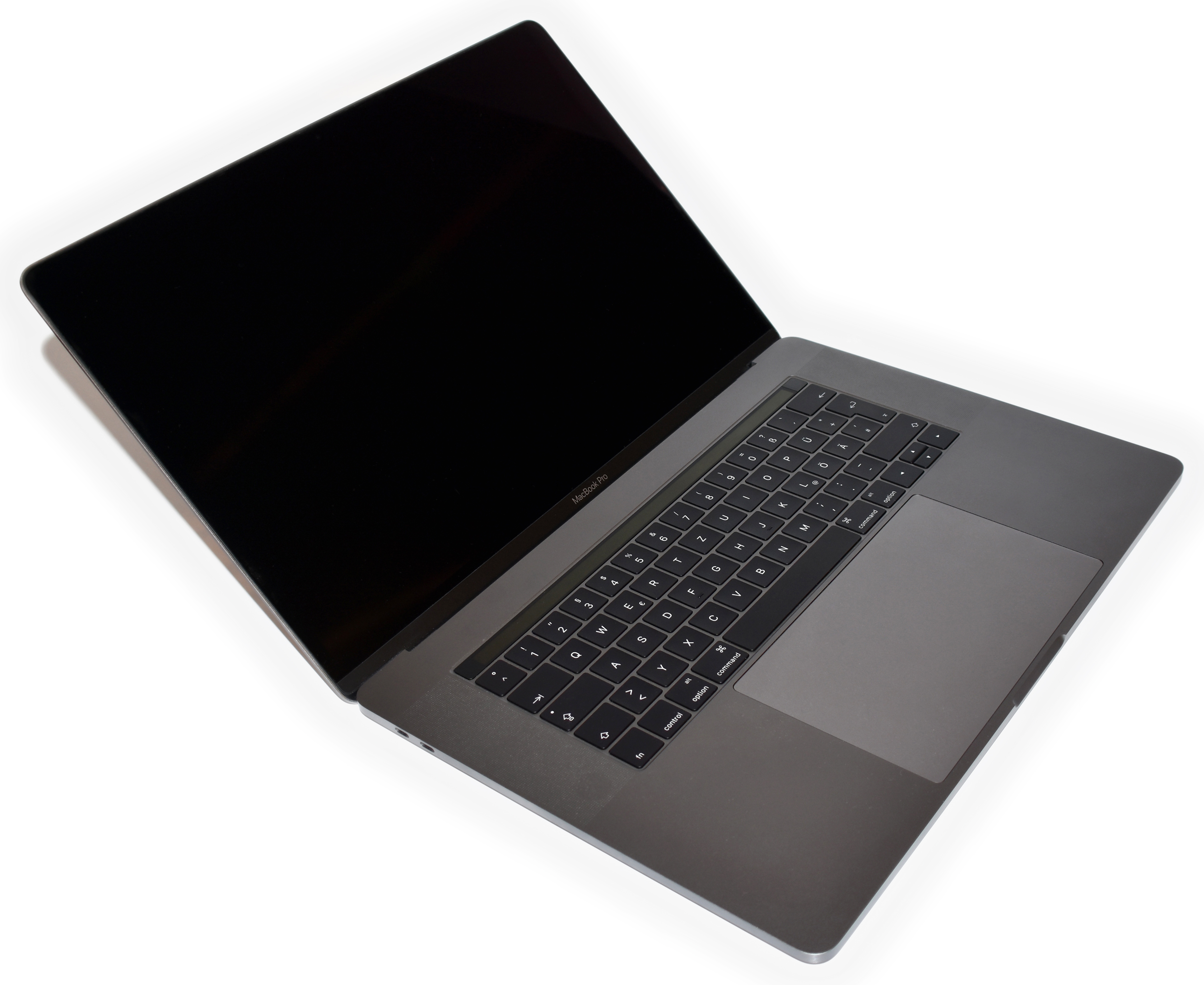
The MacBook Pro (15-inch, 2016)

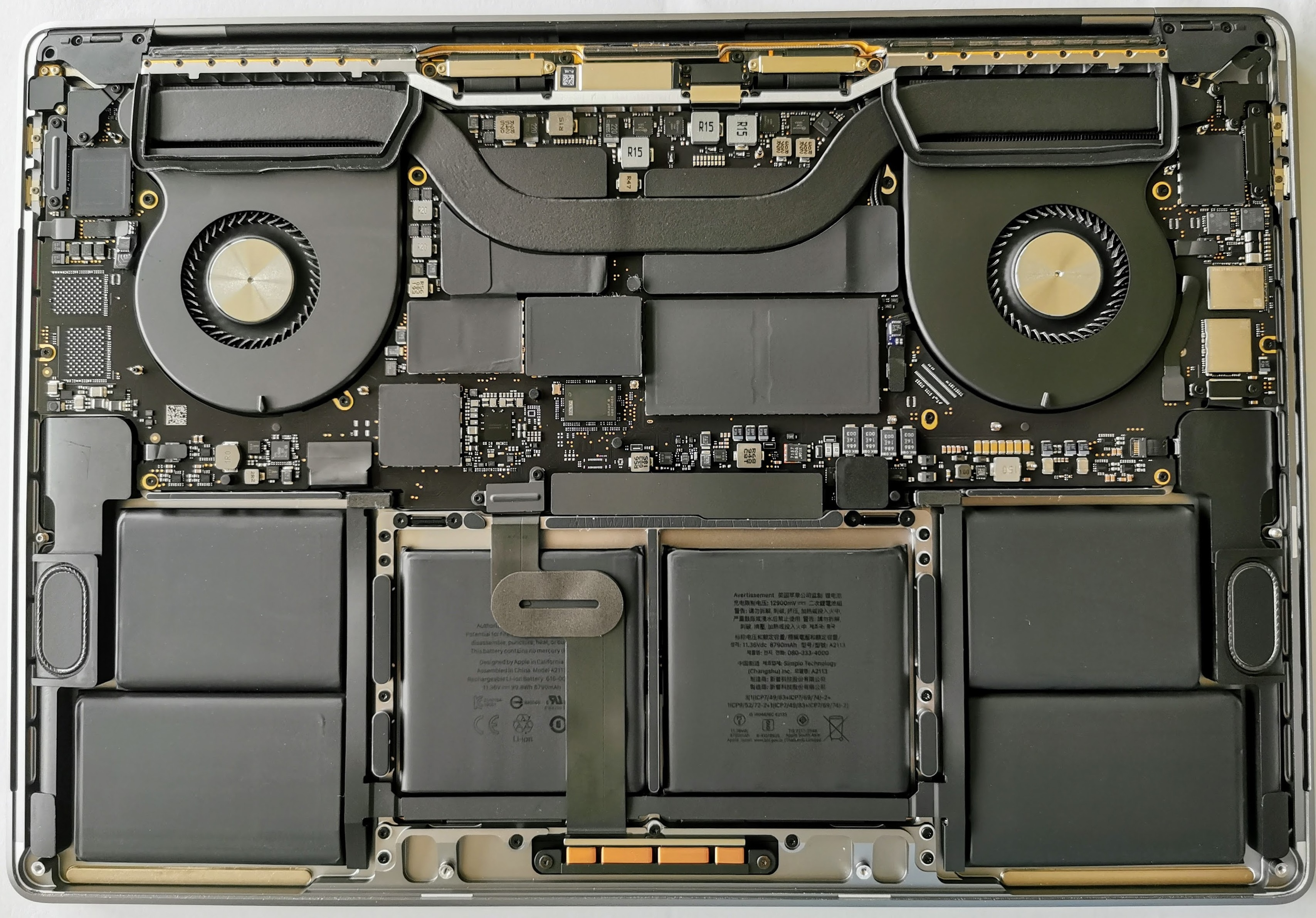
Teardown of a MacBook Pro (16-inch (410 mm), 2019) showing internal parts

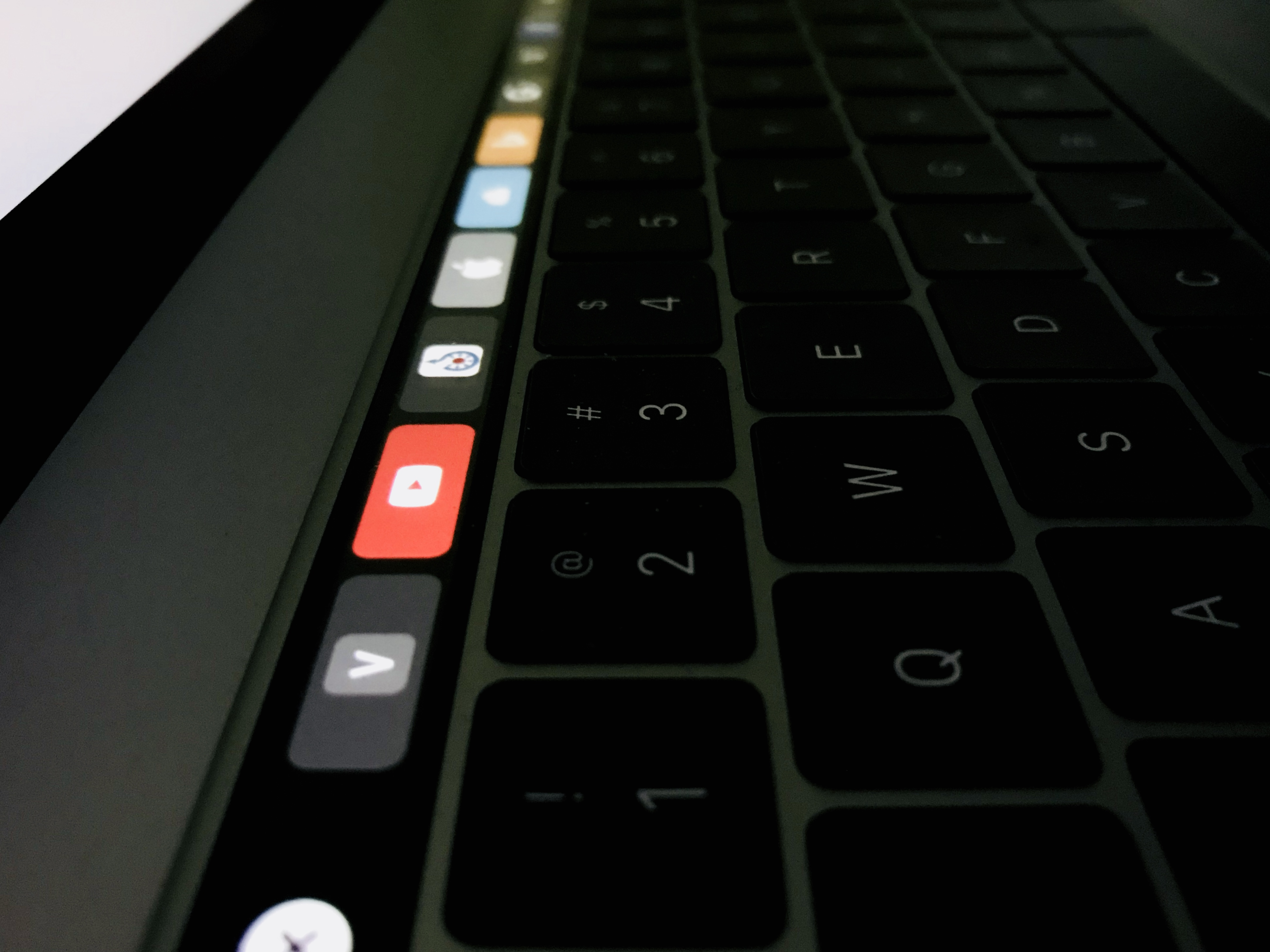
Touch Bar of MacBook Pro

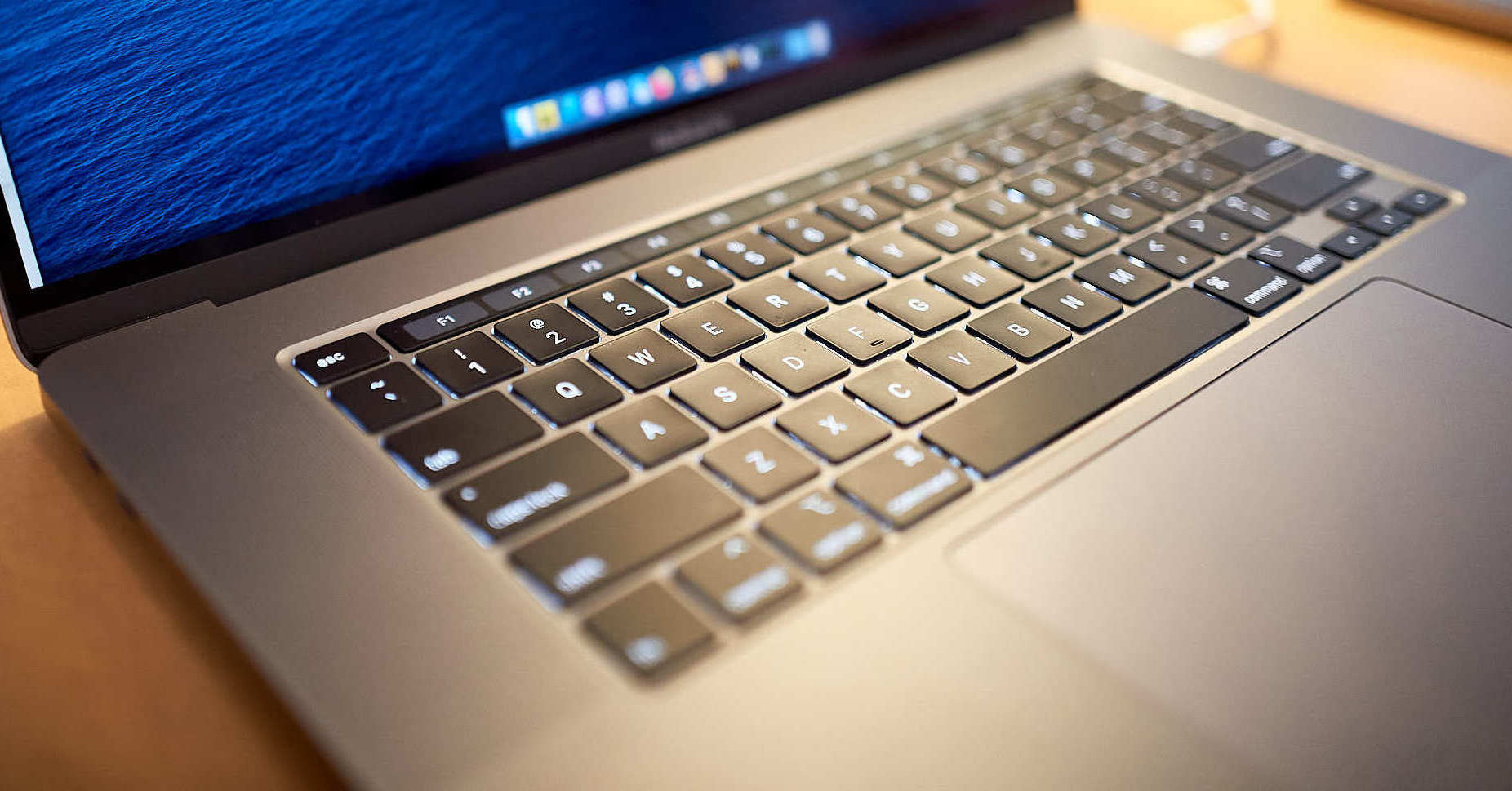
A MacBook Pro (16-inch (410 mm), 2019)

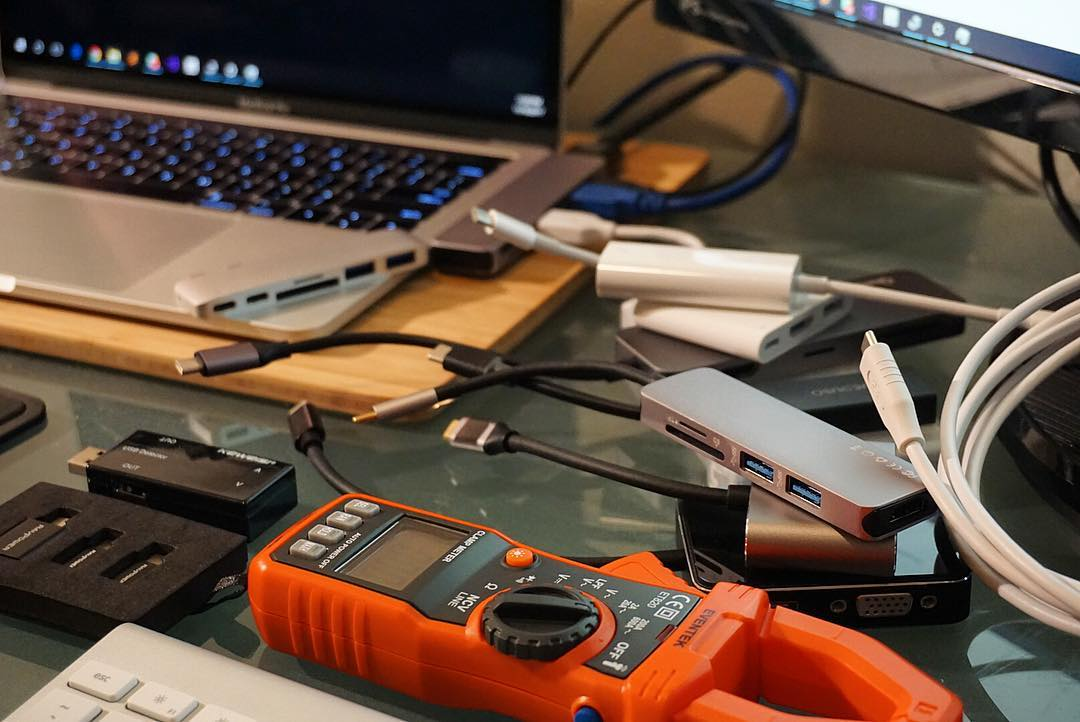
The MacBook Pro (2016) was criticized for needing hubs or dongles (shown) for USB-A or SD card connections.

Apple unveiled Touch Bar 13-and-15-inch (330 and 380 mm) MacBook Pro models during a press event at their headquarters on October 27, 2016 after the non-Retina 13-inch MacBook Pro and 2015 11-inch MacBook Air were discontinued. All models, except for the baseline 13-inch (330 mm) model, featured the Touch Bar, a new multi-touch-enabled OLED strip built into the top of the keyboard in place of the function keys. The Touch Bar is abutted on its right by a sapphire-glass button that doubles as a Touch ID sensor and a power button. The models also introduced a "second-generation" butterfly-mechanism keyboard whose keys have more travel than the first iteration in the Retina MacBook. The 13-inch (330 mm) model has a trackpad that is 46% larger than its predecessor while the 15-inch (380 mm) model has a trackpad twice as large as the Retina models.

All ports have been replaced with either two or four combination Thunderbolt 3 ports that support USB-C 3.1 Gen 2 and dual DisplayPort 1.2 signals, any of which can be used for charging. The MacBook Pro is incompatible with some older Thunderbolt 3-certified peripherals, including Intel's own reference design for Thunderbolt 3 devices. Furthermore, macOS on MacBook Pro blacklists (prevents from working) certain classes of Thunderbolt 3-compatible devices. Support for Thunderbolt 3 external graphics processing units (eGPU) was added in macOS High Sierra 10.13.4. Devices using HDMI, previous-generation Thunderbolt, and USB need an adapter to connect to the MacBook Pro. The models come with a 3.5 mm headphone jack; the TOSLINK functionality of previous MacBook Pro models has been removed.

Other updates to the MacBook Pro include dual- and quad-core Intel sixth-generation Skylake Core i5 and i7 processors, improved graphics, and displays that offer a 25% wider color gamut, 67% more brightness, and 67% more contrast. All versions can output to a 5K display; the 15-inch models can drive two such displays. The 15-inch (380 mm) models include a discrete Radeon Pro 450, 455 or 460 graphics card in addition to the integrated Intel graphics. The base 13-inch (330 mm) model has function keys instead of the Touch Bar, and just two USB-C ports. The flash storage in the Touch Bar models is soldered to the logic board and is not upgradeable, while in the 13-inch (330 mm) model without Touch Bar, it is removable, but difficult to replace, as it is a proprietary format of SSD storage.

On June 5, 2017, Apple updated the line with Intel seventh-generation Kaby Lake processors and newer graphics cards. A 128 GB (Note: 1 GB = 1 billion bytes, 1 TB = 1 trillion bytes) storage option was added for the base 13-inch (330 mm) model, down from the base 256 GB storage. New symbols were introduced to the Control and Option keys. On July 12, 2018, Apple updated the Touch Bar models with Intel eighth-generation Coffee Lake quad-core processors in 13-inch (330 mm) models and six-core processors in 15-inch (380 mm) models, updated graphics cards, third-generation butterfly keyboards that introduced new symbols for the control and option keys, Bluetooth 5, T2 security chip, True Tone display technology, and larger-capacity batteries. The 15-inch (380 mm) model can also be configured with up to 4 TB of storage, 32 GB of DDR4 memory and a Core i9 processor. In late November the higher-end 15-inch (380 mm) model could be configured with Radeon Pro Vega graphics. On May 21, 2019, Apple announced updated Touch Bar models with newer processors, with an eight-core ninth-generation Core i9-standard for the higher-end 15-inch (380 mm) model, and an updated keyboard manufactured with "new materials" across the line. On July 9, 2019, Apple updated the 13-inch (330 mm) model with two Thunderbolt ports with newer quad-core eighth-generation processors with Iris Plus graphics, True Tone display technology, and replaced the function keys with the Touch Bar. macOS Catalina added support for Dolby Atmos, Dolby Vision, and HDR10 on 2018 and newer models. macOS Catalina 10.15.2 added support for 6016 × 3384 output on 15-inch (380 mm) 2018 and newer models to run the Pro Display XDR at full resolution.

The 2019 MacBook Pro (except the 16-inch (410 mm) model) is the final model that can natively run macOS Mojave 10.14, which is the final macOS version that can run 32-bit applications such as Microsoft Office for Mac 2011.

A report by AppleInsider claimed that the updated "Butterfly" keyboard fails twice as often as previous models, often due to particles stuck beneath the keys. Repairs for stuck keys have been estimated to cost more than $700. In May 2018, two class action lawsuits were filed against Apple regarding the keyboard problem; one alleged a "constant threat of nonresponsive keys and accompanying keyboard failure" and accusing Apple of not alerting consumers to the problem. In June 2018, Apple announced a Service Program to "service eligible MacBook and MacBook Pro keyboards, free of charge". The 2018 models added a membrane underneath keys to prevent malfunction from dust. As of early 2019, there were reports of problems with the same type of keyboards in the 2018 MacBook Air. In May 2019, Apple modified the keyboard for the fourth time and promised that any MacBook keyboard with butterfly switches would be repaired or replaced free of charge for a period of four years after the date of sale.

The Touch Bar MacBook Pro received mixed reviews. The display, build quality, and audio quality were praised but many complained about the butterfly keyboard; the little-used Touch Bar; and the absence of USB-A ports, HDMI port, and SD card slot.

On May 4, 2020, Apple announced an updated 13-inch (330 mm) model with the Magic Keyboard. The four Thunderbolt port version comes with 10th-generation Ice Lake-U processors, updated graphics, up to 32 GB of memory and 4 TB of storage, and supports 6K output to run the Pro Display XDR. The two Thunderbolt port version has the same Coffee Lake processors, graphics, and maximum storage and memory as the 2019 two Thunderbolt port models. The 2020 13-inch (330 mm) models are also 0.02 inches (0.51 mm) thicker than the 2019 models.

== Apple silicon ==
=== 13-inch with Touch Bar (2020–2023) ===
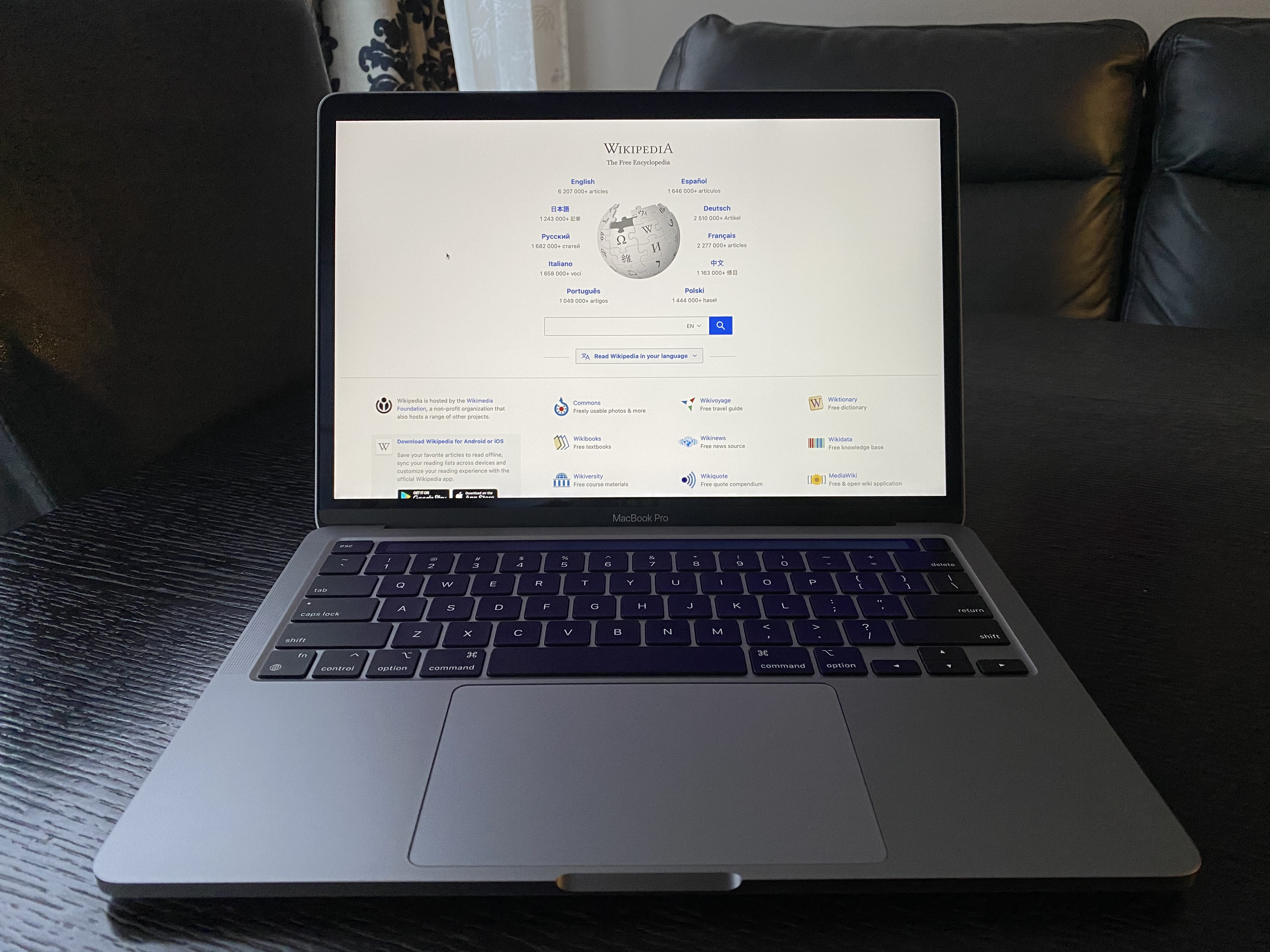
A MacBook Pro (13-inch, M1, 2020)

On November 10, 2020, Apple introduced a new 13-inch MacBook Pro with two Thunderbolt ports and the Apple M1 processor, replacing the previous generation of Intel-based 2020 baseline 13-inch MacBook Pro with two Thunderbolt ports. The M1 13-inch MacBook Pro was released alongside an updated MacBook Air and Mac Mini as the first generation of Macs with Apple's new line of custom ARM-based Apple silicon processors. This MacBook Pro model retains the same form factor and adds support for Wi-Fi 6, USB4, and 6K output to run the Pro Display XDR. The number of supported external displays was reduced to one, as the previous Intel-based models supported two 4K displays. The FaceTime camera remained at 720p, but Apple advertised an improved image signal processor for higher quality video.

The 13-inch MacBook Pro was updated with the M2 chip in June 2022. In October 2023, with the unveiling of the M3 family of chips, the 13-inch MacBook Pro with Touch Bar was discontinued. Apple chose to use the newer 14-inch enclosure design for entry-level MacBook Pro internals.

=== 14-inch and 16-inch with Liquid Retina XDR display (2021–present) ===
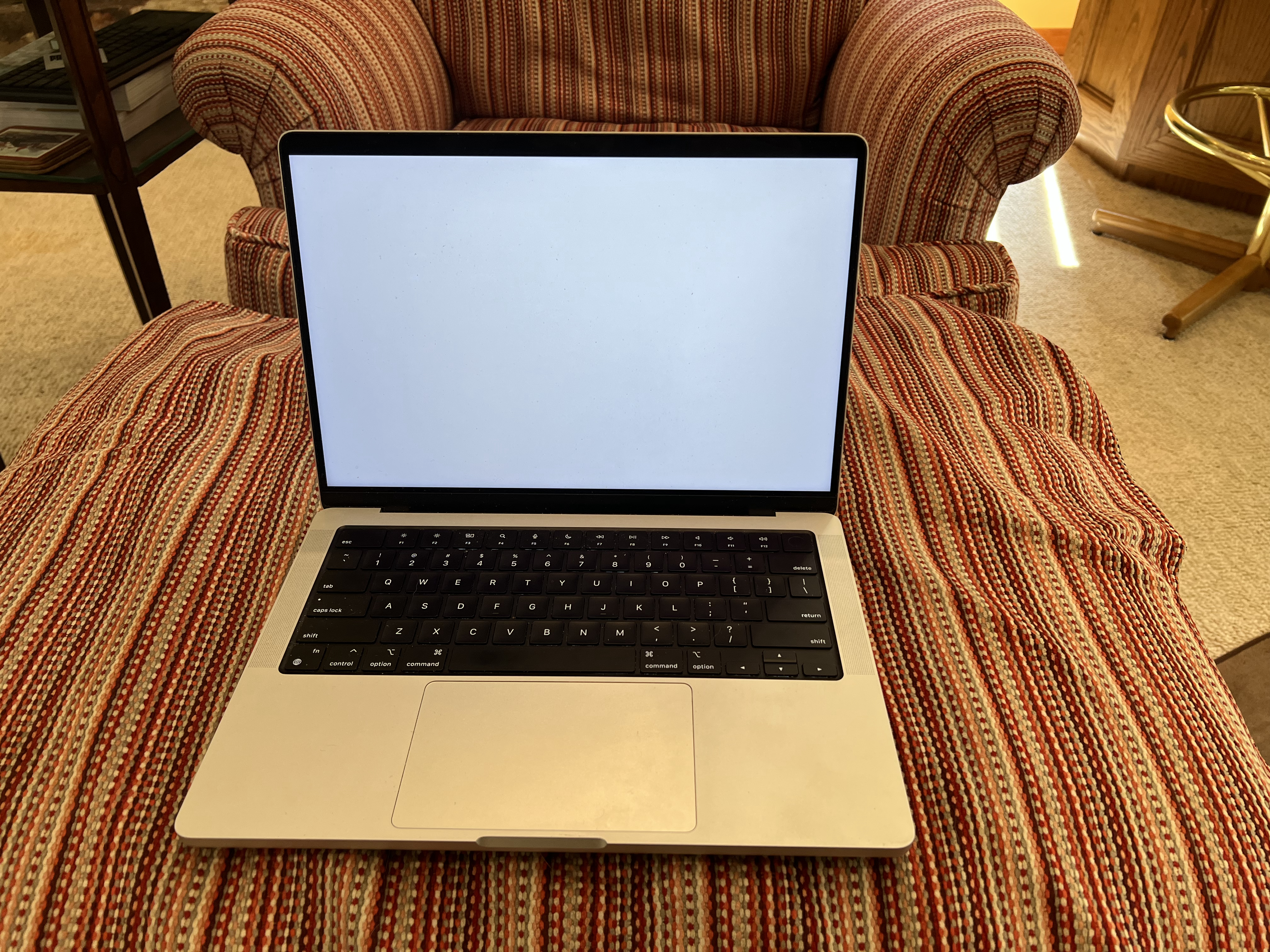
A silver MacBook Pro (14-inch, 2021). This picture hides the camera notch that is at the top of the display.

On October 18, 2021, Apple replaced the high-end 13-and-16-inch (330 and 410 mm) Intel-based MacBook Pros with 14-and-16-inch (360 and 410 mm) MacBook Pros, now equipped with the new Apple silicon chips, M1 Pro and M1 Max, Apple's second ARM-based chips and their first workstation-power chips. Apple restored the function keys in place of the Touch Bar, an HDMI port, an SD card reader, MagSafe charging, and a higher base memory, addressing many criticisms of the Touch Bar models. Other additions include an edge-to-edge Liquid Retina XDR display with thinner bezels and an iPhone-like notch, ProMotion variable refresh rate, a 1080p webcam, Wi-Fi 6, three Thunderbolt ports, a six-speaker sound system supporting Dolby Atmos, and support of multiple external displays.

These new models feature a thicker and more-squared design than their Intel-based predecessors. The keyboard features full-sized function keys, with the keyboard set in a "double anodized" black well. The MacBook Pro branding has been removed from the bottom of the display bezel and is engraved on the underside of the chassis instead. The models' appearance have been compared to the Titanium PowerBook G4 produced from 2001 to 2003.

They were offered in two colors—space gray and silver—and could be configured with 16 GB, 32 GB and 64 GB (M1 Max only) unified RAM and 512 GB, 1 TB, 2 TB, 4 TB and 8 TB SSD storage.

The stated battery life was 21 hours, which was a marked increase on the 2019 Intel version, and weighed 2.1 kg, which was 100 grams heavier than the previous 2019 model at 2.0 kg. The screen increased very slightly in size from 16 in (406 mm) to 16.2 in (411 mm) and the resolution rose from 3072 × 1920 pixels to 3456 × 2234 pixels with an adaptive 120 Hz refresh rate. The camera quality increased from 720p to 1080p and the model features Wi-Fi 6 and three Thunderbolt 4 ports.

These were also the first MacBook Pros to use an enclosure made of 100% recycled aluminium, as well as 100% recycled rare earth elements in all magnets as part of Apple's mission to have net-zero climate impact by 2030.

In January 2023, the 14-and-16-inch (360 and 410 mm) models were updated. The new models come with the Apple M2 Pro and M2 Max, can be configured with up to 96 GB of RAM (up from 64 GB), support HDMI 2.1 that can drive an 8K external display (the 2021 models supported HDMI 2.0), and support faster Wi-Fi 6E. Apple advertises the new 16-inch (410 mm) model with "up to 22 hours" of battery life, stating it is the "longest battery life ever" in a Mac.

In October 2023, the 14-and-16-inch (360 and 410 mm) MacBook Pros were updated with the Apple M3 family of chips. Compared to the previous-generation models with M2 Pro and M2 Max, the M3 Pro and M3 Max models offer improved performance, new hardware capabilities and more memory, with Space Black replacing Space Gray as a color option. Apple also added an entry-level configuration for the 14-inch (360 mm) MacBook Pro, positioned as a replacement for the discontinued 13-inch (330 mm) MacBook Pro with Touch Bar. Like the older 13-inch (330 mm) model, and unlike the other 14-and-16-inch (360 and 410 mm) configurations, this configuration features Apple's entry-level M-series chip (M3), two Thunderbolt ports, a single internal fan, support for only one external display, and Silver and Space Gray as color options.

In October 2024, Apple announced updated 14-and-16-inch (360 and 410 mm) MacBook Pros with the Apple M4 family of chips. Apple also updated the lineup to include more RAM, in which the 14-and-16-inch (360 and 410 mm) models, respectively, come with 16 GB and 24 GB RAM as standard—where the 14-inch model previously started at 8 GB with the M3 chip. When fitted with the higher-spec Apple M4 Max, both the 14-and-16-inch (360 and 410 mm) 2024 MacBook Pros can boast up to 128 GB of unified memory.

In October 2025, Apple announced the updated 14-inch (360 mm) MacBook Pros to feature the Apple M5 chip.

In March 2026, Apple announced the updated 14-and-16-inch (360 and 410 mm) models with the M5 Pro and M5 Max chips, and the Apple N1 networking chip with Wi-Fi 7 and Bluetooth 6. The amount of memory can be configured up to 64 GB on the M5 Pro (up from 48 GB). The base storage was also increased to 1 TB on the M5 and M5 Pro (up from 512 GB), and 2 TB on the M5 Max.

In October 2026, Apple announced the 14-inch (360 mm) MacBook Pro with the Apple M6 chip, the dual 16-core Neural Engine, and the N1 chip with Wi-Fi 7 and Bluetooth 6, using the old chassis. It adds support for up to two external displays at 4K resolution at 165 Hz, up from 144 Hz.

=== 14-inch and 16-inch with PROLED XDR display (2026–present) ===
In October 2026, Apple announced MacBook Pro models in 14-inch and 16-inch sizes with a tandem OLED display, called "PROLED XDR". The models use the M5 Pro and M5 Max chips and are the first Mac models with touchscreen displays, and have a slightly smaller chassis size and reduced overall weight. They also replace the notch at the top of the display with a Dynamic Island similar to that found on the iPhone (similar in size to the iPhone 18 Pro), include an improved speaker system, and reintroduce the illuminated Apple logo on the rear of the display, which was removed with the 2016 models.

== Supported operating systems ==
=== macOS ===
As of October 2026, macOS Golden Gate is the current release of macOS, being compatible with all Apple silicon–based MacBook Pros while dropping support for all remaining Intel models that support macOS Tahoe. Most unsupported MacBook Pro computers can run macOS Sequoia or macOS Tahoe via the use of a compatible utility.

Supported macOS version by MacBook Pro model
OS release	Intel-based																								Apple silicon									
OS release	Aluminum					Unibody							Retina						Touch Bar and function keys						13" with Touch Bar		14" and 16"							PROLED XDR, 14" and 16"
OS release	Original	Late 2006	Mid 2007	Late 2007	Early 2008	Late 2008	Early 2009	Mid 2009	Mid 2010	Early 2011	Late 2011	Mid 2012 (Note: Includes 15-inch Retina model released on the same date.)	Late 2012	Early 2013	Late 2013	Mid 2014	Early 2015	Mid 2015	2016	2017	2018	13" and 15", 2019	16", 2019	2020	M1, 2020	M2, 2022	M1, 2021	M2, 2023	M3, Nov 2023	M4, 2024	M5	M5 Pro/Max	M6	M5 Pro/Max
10.4 Tiger	10.4.5; 10.4.6 (Note: 15-inch Glossy and 17-inch models.)	10.4.8	10.4.9	Unofficial	Partial (Note: Requires a 2007 MacBook Pro install (10.4.9 minimum). Trackpad settings and function keys are unavailable (The top case needs to be replaced with a 2007 model to work). Audio input/output will only work with "Mac OS X 10.4.11 Combo Update".)	—N/a	—N/a	—N/a	—N/a	—N/a	—N/a	—N/a	—N/a	—N/a	—N/a	—N/a	—N/a	—N/a	—N/a	—N/a	—N/a	—N/a	—N/a	—N/a	—N/a	—N/a	—N/a	—N/a	—N/a	—N/a	—N/a	—N/a	—N/a	—N/a
10.5 Leopard	Yes	Yes	Yes	Yes	10.5.2; 10.5.4 (Note: Late 2008 17-inch model.)	10.5.5	10.5.6	10.5.7	—N/a	—N/a	—N/a	—N/a	—N/a	—N/a	—N/a	—N/a	—N/a	—N/a	—N/a	—N/a	—N/a	—N/a	—N/a	—N/a	—N/a	—N/a	—N/a	—N/a	—N/a	—N/a	—N/a	—N/a	—N/a	—N/a
10.6 Snow Leopard	With 1 GB RAM	Yes	Yes	Yes	Yes	Yes	Yes	Yes	10.6.3	10.6.6	Unofficial	Partial, patch (Note: Requires "mach_kernel" patch. Even if the latest software updates are installed, sound, sleep, screen brightness and graphics acceleration will not work. Only Unibody MacBook Pros were tested, Retinas are still unknown.)	Unconfirmed		—N/a	—N/a	—N/a	—N/a	—N/a	—N/a	—N/a	—N/a	—N/a	—N/a	—N/a	—N/a	—N/a	—N/a	—N/a	—N/a	—N/a	—N/a	—N/a	—N/a
10.7 Lion	Patch, With 2 GB RAM (Note: Requires system files patching. Up to 10.7.3 or 10.7.5 with no Wi-Fi.)	With 2 GB RAM	Yes	Yes	Yes	Yes	Yes	Yes	Yes	Yes	10.7.2	10.7.4	Unconfirmed		—N/a	—N/a	—N/a	—N/a	—N/a	—N/a	—N/a	—N/a	—N/a	—N/a	—N/a	—N/a	—N/a	—N/a	—N/a	—N/a	—N/a	—N/a	—N/a	—N/a
10.8 Mountain Lion	No	Patch, with 2 GB RAM (Note: The ATI Radeon X1600 graphics acceleration was ported to OS X 10.8 and 10.9, and is incompatible with OS X 10.10 and later. However, the framebuffer is still available.)	Yes	Yes	Yes	Yes	Yes	Yes	Yes	Yes	Yes	Yes	10.8.1	10.8.2	Partial (Note: PlatformSupport.plist needs to be changed or deleted. Audio input/output and display scaling will not work properly.)		—N/a	—N/a	—N/a	—N/a	—N/a	—N/a	—N/a	—N/a	—N/a	—N/a	—N/a	—N/a	—N/a	—N/a	—N/a	—N/a	—N/a	—N/a
10.9 Mavericks	No	Patch, with 2 GB RAM	Yes	Yes	Yes	Yes	Yes	Yes	Yes	Yes	Yes	Yes	Yes	Yes	Yes	10.9.4	—N/a	—N/a	—N/a	—N/a	—N/a	—N/a	—N/a	—N/a	—N/a	—N/a	—N/a	—N/a	—N/a	—N/a	—N/a	—N/a	—N/a	—N/a
10.10 Yosemite	No	Patch, with 2 GB RAM	Yes	Yes	Yes	Yes	Yes	Yes	Yes	Yes	Yes	Yes	Yes	Yes	Yes	Yes	10.10.2	10.10.3	—N/a	—N/a	—N/a	—N/a	—N/a	—N/a	—N/a	—N/a	—N/a	—N/a	—N/a	—N/a	—N/a	—N/a	—N/a	—N/a
10.11 El Capitan	No	Patch, with 2 GB RAM	Yes	Yes	Yes	Yes	Yes	Yes	Yes	Yes	Yes	Yes	Yes	Yes	Yes	Yes	Yes	Yes	—N/a	—N/a	—N/a	—N/a	—N/a	—N/a	—N/a	—N/a	—N/a	—N/a	—N/a	—N/a	—N/a	—N/a	—N/a	—N/a
10.12 Sierra	No	No	No	No	Patch				Yes	Yes	Yes	Yes	Yes	Yes	Yes	Yes	Yes	Yes	Yes (Note: 13-inch Function Keys models.); 10.12.1 (Note: Touch Bar models.)	10.12.5	—N/a	—N/a	—N/a	—N/a	—N/a	—N/a	—N/a	—N/a	—N/a	—N/a	—N/a	—N/a	—N/a	—N/a
10.13 High Sierra	No	No	No	No	Patch				Yes	Yes	Yes	Yes	Yes	Yes	Yes	Yes	Yes	Yes	Yes	Yes	10.13.6	—N/a	—N/a	—N/a	—N/a	—N/a	—N/a	—N/a	—N/a	—N/a	—N/a	—N/a	—N/a	—N/a
10.14 Mojave	No	No	No	No	Patch							Yes	Yes	Yes	Yes	Yes	Yes	Yes	Yes	Yes	Yes	10.14.5	—N/a	—N/a	—N/a	—N/a	—N/a	—N/a	—N/a	—N/a	—N/a	—N/a	—N/a	—N/a
10.15 Catalina	No	No	No	No	Patch, with 4 GB RAM				Patch			Yes	Yes	Yes	Yes	Yes	Yes	Yes	Yes	Yes	Yes	Yes	10.15.1	10.15.4	—N/a	—N/a	—N/a	—N/a	—N/a	—N/a	—N/a	—N/a	—N/a	—N/a
11 Big Sur	No	No	No	No	Patch, with 4 GB RAM				Patch						Yes	Yes	Yes	Yes	Yes	Yes	Yes	Yes	Yes	Yes	Yes	—N/a	—N/a	—N/a	—N/a	—N/a	—N/a	—N/a	—N/a	—N/a
12 Monterey	No	No	No	No	Patch, with 4 GB RAM				Patch								Yes	Yes	Yes	Yes	Yes	Yes	Yes	Yes	Yes	12.4	Yes	—N/a	—N/a	—N/a	—N/a	—N/a	—N/a	—N/a
13 Ventura	No	No	No	No	Patch, with 4 GB RAM				Patch											Yes	Yes	Yes	Yes	Yes	Yes	Yes	Yes		13.5 (Note: Entry-level M3 14-inch models.)	—N/a	—N/a	—N/a	—N/a	—N/a
14 Sonoma	No	No	No	No	Patch, with 4 GB RAM				Patch												Yes	Yes	Yes	Yes	Yes	Yes	Yes	Yes	14.1	—N/a	—N/a	—N/a	—N/a	—N/a
15 Sequoia	No	No	No	No	Patch, with 4 GB RAM				Patch												Yes	Yes	Yes	Yes	Yes	Yes	Yes	Yes	Yes	Yes	—N/a	—N/a	—N/a	—N/a
26 Tahoe	No	No	No	No	Patch, with 4 GB RAM				Patch												No	No	Yes	Only four Thunderbolt 3 ports model	Yes	Yes	Yes	Yes	Yes	Yes	Yes	26.3	—N/a	—N/a
27 Golden Gate	No	No	No	No	No	No	No	No	No	No	No	No	No	No	No	No	No	No	No	No	No	No	No	No	Yes	Yes	Yes	Yes	Yes	Yes	Yes	Yes	27.2	27.2

=== Windows (Intel only) ===
Boot Camp Assistant allows Intel Macs to dual-boot Windows. Apple silicon Macs do not support Boot Camp, even with ARM64 versions of Windows. Windows 11 and versions of Windows released prior to XP are not officially supported by Boot Camp.

Supported Windows releases
OS release		Aluminum			Unibody			Retina			Touch Bar
OS release		2006 models	2007 models	2008–2009 models	Mid 2010	2011 models	Mid 2012	Late 2012–2014	Early 2015	Mid 2015	Intel models 2016–2020
Windows 2000		Unofficial	Unofficial	Unofficial	No	No	No	No	No	No	No
Windows XP (Note: Windows XP can only be installed on Macs with Boot Camp 3 or earlier. This includes Mac OS X 10.6 or earlier and copies of Mac OS X 10.7 that have not been updated to Boot Camp 4.) (Note: Only 32-bit editions of Windows XP are supported.)		Yes	Yes	Yes	Yes	No	No	No	No	No	No
Windows Vista	32-bit (Note: Windows Vista can only be installed on Macs with Boot Camp 3 or earlier. This includes Mac OS X 10.6 or earlier and copies of Mac OS X 10.7 that have not been updated to Boot Camp 4.)	Yes	Yes	Yes	Yes	No	No	No	No	No	No
Windows Vista	64-bit	No	Upgrade	Yes	Yes	Partial	Partial	No	No	No	No
Windows 7	32-bit (Note: The 32-bit version of Windows 7 can only be installed on Macs with Boot Camp 3.1 to 6.0. This includes OS X 10.11 and earlier.)	Upgrade	Yes	Yes	Yes	Yes	Yes	No	No	No	No
Windows 7	64-bit (Note: The 64-bit version of Windows 7 can only be installed on Macs with Boot Camp 3.1 or later, running macOS High Sierra or earlier. Later versions of macOS no longer support Windows 7.)	No	Upgrade	Yes	Yes	Yes	Yes	Yes	No	No	No
Windows 8 (Note: Windows 8 can only be installed on Macs with Boot Camp 5.0 to 6.0. This includes OS X 10.11 and earlier.) (Note: Only 64-bit versions of Windows are supported for Windows 8 and later.)		Upgrade, 32-bit for early 2006 only	Upgrade	Upgrade	Partial, Patch (Note: Only the 15 and 17-inch models of the Mid-2010 MacBook Pro support Windows 8 and 8.1. The 13-inch model is not supported.)	Yes	Yes	Yes	Yes	No	No
Windows 8.1 (Note: Windows 8.1 can only be installed on Macs with Boot Camp 5.1 or later, running macOS High Sierra or earlier. Later versions of macOS no longer support Windows 8.1.)		Upgrade, 32-bit for early 2006 only	Upgrade	Upgrade	Partial, Patch	Yes	Yes	Yes	Yes	Yes	No
Windows 10 (Note: Windows 10 can only be installed on Macs with Boot Camp 6.0 or later. It is the only supported version of Windows on macOS Mojave and later.)		Upgrade, 32-bit for early 2006 only	Upgrade	Upgrade	Patch	Patch	Yes	Yes	Yes	Yes	Yes
Windows 11 (Note: Windows 11 does not natively support Boot Camp.)		Late 2006 only	Reinstall								

== Current lineup ==
Release date	Model	Processor
March 11, 2026	MacBook Pro (14-inch, M5 Pro or M5 Max)	Apple M5 Pro or M5 Max
March 11, 2026	MacBook Pro (16-inch, M5 Pro or M5 Max)	Apple M5 Pro or M5 Max
November 6, 2026	MacBook Pro (14-inch, M6)	Apple M6
November 6, 2026	MacBook Pro (14-inch PROLED XDR)	Apple M5 Pro or M5 Max
November 6, 2026	MacBook Pro (16-inch PROLED XDR)	Apple M5 Pro or M5 Max

== Timeline ==
Timeline of portable Macintoshes
See also: List of Mac models
