= MacBook =

Line of laptop computers by Apple

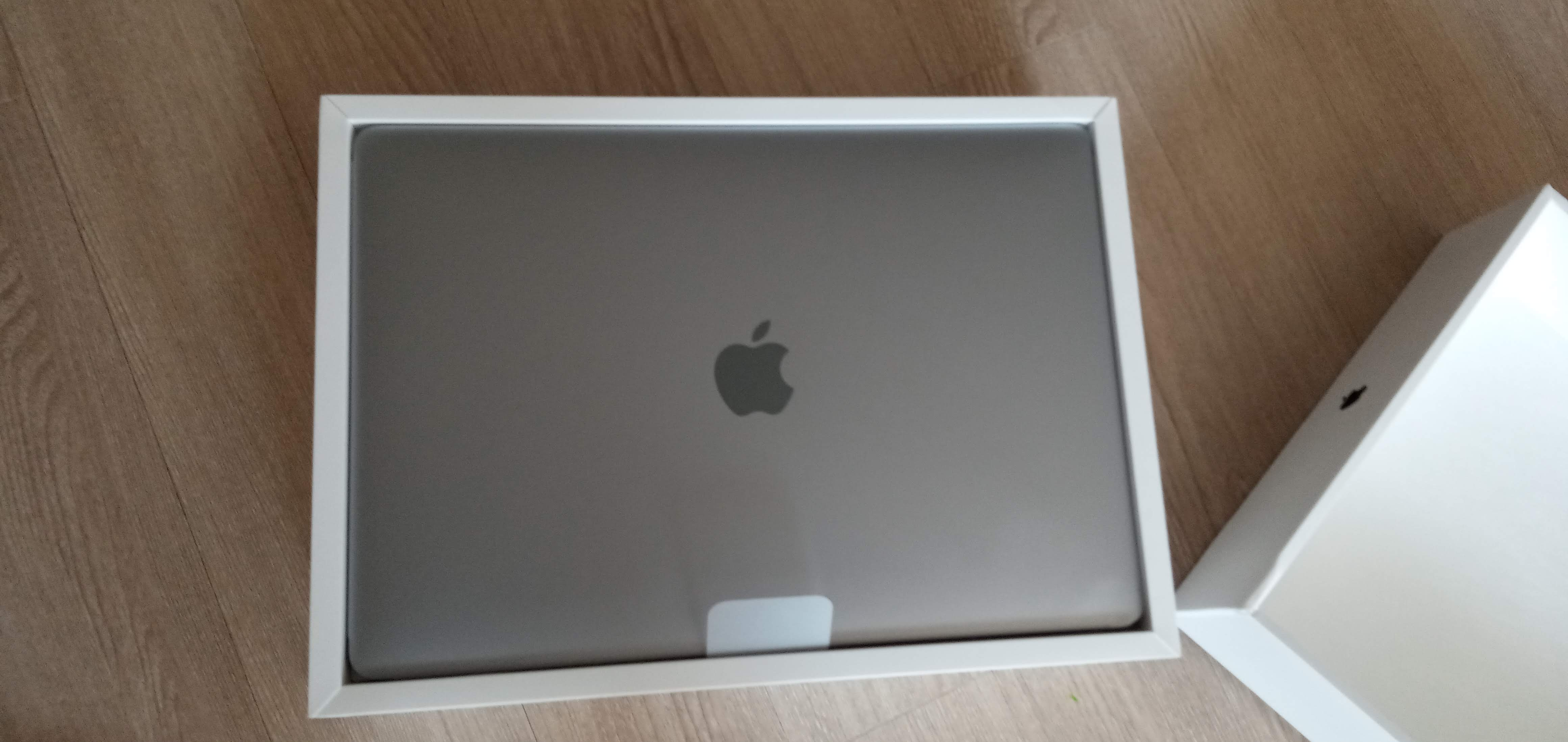
A 13-inch MacBook Pro in packaging

The MacBook is a line of Mac-branded laptops developed and marketed by Apple since 2006, running on macOS. The MacBook brand replaced the PowerBook and iBook brands during the Mac transition to Intel processors, announced by Steve Jobs in 2005. The current lineup consists of the MacBook Pro (2006–present), MacBook Air (2008–present), and the MacBook Neo (2026–present). Two different lines simply named "MacBook" were sold from 2006 to 2012 and 2015 to 2019. The MacBook brand was named as the "world's top-selling line of premium laptops" in 2015.

== Overview ==
The MacBook family was initially housed in designs similar to the iBook and PowerBook lines which preceded them, which changed to a unibody aluminum construction similar to the one first introduced with the MacBook Air. The unibody construction also has a plastic keyboard that was first used on the MacBook Air, which itself was inspired by the sunken keyboard of the original polycarbonate MacBooks. While the MacBook Air and Pro models have standardized black plastic keys, the MacBook Neo's keycaps vary based on the body color.

The lids of the MacBook family are held closed by a magnet with no mechanical latch, a design element first introduced with the polycarbonate MacBook. The memory, drives, and batteries were accessible in the old MacBook lineup, though the newest compact lineup solders or glues all such components in place. Only the MacBook Air and MacBook Pro feature backlit keyboards, the MacBook Neo does not.

== Models named "MacBook" ==
=== MacBook (2006–2012) ===
As part of the Mac transition to Intel processors, Apple released a 13-inch laptop simply named "MacBook", as a successor to the PowerPC-based iBook series of laptops. During its existence, it was the most affordable Mac, serving as the entry-level laptop that was less expensive than the rest of the Mac laptop lineup (the MacBook Pro portable workstation, and later the MacBook Air ultra-portable). It was aimed at the consumer and education markets. Successive revisions of the MacBook were sold to consumers between May 2006 and July 2011, by which time it been superseded by the MacBook Air which had a lower entry price. Apple continued to sell the MacBook to educational institutions until February 2012.

During its existence, it was the best-selling Mac in Apple's history. For five months in 2008, it was the best-selling laptop of any brand in US retail stores. Collectively, the MacBook brand was the "world's top-selling line of premium laptops."

There have been three separate designs of this MacBook. The original design used a combination of polycarbonate and fiberglass casing which was modeled after the iBook G4. The second design, introduced in October 2008 alongside the 15-inch MacBook Pro, shared the latter's unibody aluminium casing, but lacked a FireWire port. A third design, introduced in late 2009, retained a similar unibody construction but changed back to white polycarbonate. The aluminum unibody design continued in productions as the newly introduced 13-inch MacBook Pro.

=== 12-inch MacBook (2015–2019) ===
In 2015, Apple introduced the 12-inch MacBook (unofficially called the Retina MacBook, officially marketed as the new MacBook), which sat between the MacBook Air and MacBook Pro in Apple's laptop lineup. It was more compact than any other notebook in the MacBook family at the time and included a Retina display, fanless design, a Butterfly keyboard with lower key travel. It only had one USB-C port, used for both power and data, as well as a 3.5 mm headphone jack. The MacBook was later revised in 2016 and 2017, and discontinued in July 2019, a year after the release of the MacBook Air with Retina display. It was also the thinnest MacBook ever, at a height of 0.14–0.52 inches (0.35–1.31 cm) with a tapered wedge shape.

== MacBook family ==
=== MacBook Neo ===
The MacBook Neo is Apple's entry-level MacBook. It features an iPhone chip, the A18 Pro, at its core and is designed primarily for education and budget-conscious customers. The first MacBook Neo was launched on March 4, 2026. At launch, the model with 256 GB base storage was priced at US$599 (US$499 for students). The other option is 512 GB of storage and features Touch ID formerly priced at US$699. It also features four colors (Silver, Blush, Citrus, and Indigo), a 1080p webcam, dual mics and speakers, two USB-C ports, and a headphone jack.

On June 25, 2026, due to the global memory shortages, the price was increased to all MacBook Neo models by US$100.

=== MacBook Air ===
The MacBook Air is Apple's mid-range notebook computer. While the 1st generation was released as a premium ultraportable positioned above the 2006–2012 MacBook, lowered prices on subsequent iterations and the discontinuation of that MacBook have made it serve as the entry-level Mac portable. The 2010–2017 base model came with a 13-inch screen and was Apple's thinnest notebook computer until the introduction of the MacBook in March 2015. This MacBook Air model features two USB Type-A 3.0 ports and a Thunderbolt 2 port, as well as an SDXC card slot (only on the 13-inch model). This model of MacBook Air did not have a Retina display. A MacBook Air model with an 11-inch screen was available from early October 2010 to late October 2016. In 2017, the MacBook Air received a small refresh, with the processor speed increasing to 1.8 GHz.

On October 30, 2018, the MacBook Air underwent a major design change, dropping the USB Type-A ports, MagSafe, and the SD card slot in favor of two USB-C/Thunderbolt 3 ports and a headphone jack. It was updated with a Retina display and Intel Y-series Amber Lake i5 CPUs, as well as a Force Touch trackpad, a third-generation butterfly mechanism keyboard, and the Touch ID sensor found in the fourth-generation MacBook Pro, but without the Touch Bar. The base price was also raised, although the base configuration of the 2017 model was retained until July 9, 2019, when it was discontinued along with the Retina MacBook. The base price of this model was also dropped to $1099 ($999 for students) on the same day.

On November 10, 2020, Apple announced that the MacBook Air would use the new Apple M1 system on a chip. The M1 Air does not have a fan, ensuring silent operation but limiting the M1 chip speed in sustained operations. Performance was claimed to be higher than most current Intel laptops.

On June 6, 2022, at WWDC 2022, Apple announced a new MacBook Air based on the Apple M2 system on a chip. It incorporates several design elements from the fifth-generation MacBook Pro models, such as a flat, slab-shaped design, full-sized function keys, and a Liquid Retina display with rounded corners and a notch for a 1080p webcam, but retains the previous generation's fanless design. It includes two combination Thunderbolt 3/USB 4 ports and adds MagSafe charging.

On June 5, 2023, at WWDC 2023, Apple announced a larger 15-inch version of the M2 model. Since 2024, the 13- and 15-inch models are updated annually with new M series processors.

=== MacBook Pro ===
The MacBook Pro is Apple's higher-end notebook available in 14-inch and 16-inch configurations. The most recent 13-inch MacBook Pro was introduced in June 2022. It features a touch-sensitive OLED display strip located in place of the function keys, a Touch ID sensor integrated with the power button, and four USB-C ports that also serve as Thunderbolt 3 ports. The 13-inch model was also available in a less expensive configuration with conventional function keys and only two USB-C/Thunderbolt 3 ports, but since July 2019, the base MacBook Pro model has the Touch Bar as well as quad-core processors, similar to the higher-end models, although it still has only two USB-C / Thunderbolt 3 ports. The May 2020 refresh adopts many of the upgrades seen in the 16-inch 2019 MacBook Pro, including the scissor mechanism keyboard ("Magic Keyboard") and a physical Escape button.

On November 13, 2019, Apple released the 16-inch MacBook Pro, replacing the 15-inch model of the previous generation, and replacing the butterfly keyboard with a scissor mechanism keyboard (dubbed the Magic Keyboard by Apple), reverting to the old "inverted-T" arrow key layout, replacing the virtual Escape key on the Touch Bar with a physical key, and replacing the AMD Polaris and Vega graphics from the 15-inch model with options from AMD's Navi graphics architecture, as well as reengineering the speakers, microphone array, and the thermal system compared to the 15-inch; the latter had thermal limitations in the 15-inch model due to its design. In addition, the 16-inch is available with up to 64 GB of DDR4 2667 MHz RAM and up to 8 TB of SSD storage. It also has a 100 Wh battery; this is the largest battery that can be easily carried onto a commercial airliner under U.S. Transportation Security Administration rules.

On November 10, 2020, Apple announced a new model of the MacBook Pro incorporating the new Apple M1 system on a chip. It has a fan, allowing sustained operation of the M1 chip at its full performance level, which is claimed to match or exceed that of Intel versions. Unlike Intel Pro models, the M1 version only comes with a 13-inch screen, has only two Thunderbolt ports, and has a maximum of 16 GB random access memory (RAM).

On October 18, 2021, Apple announced new 14-inch and 16-inch MacBook Pro models during an online event. They are based on the M1 Pro and M1 Max, Apple's first professional-focused ARM-based systems on a chip. This release addressed many criticisms of the previous generation by reintroducing hard function keys in place of the Touch Bar, an HDMI 2.0 port, an SDXC reader and MagSafe charging. Other additions include a Liquid Retina XDR display with thinner bezels and an iPhone-like notch, ProMotion supporting a 120Hz variable refresh rate, a 1080p webcam, Wi-Fi 6, 3 Thunderbolt 4 ports, a six-speaker sound system supporting Dolby Atmos, and support for a third 6K display on M1 Max models. The 16-inch version is bundled with a 140W GaN power supply that supports USB-C Power Delivery 3.1, though only MagSafe supports full-speed charging as the machine's USB-C ports are limited to 100W.

On June 6, 2022, Apple announced an updated 13-inch MacBook Pro based on the Apple M2 system on a chip. It is housed in the same chassis as the previous M1 MacBook Pro.

On January 17, 2023, Apple announced updated 14-inch and 16-inch MacBook Pro models based on the M2 Pro and M2 Max chips. The updated models also include Bluetooth 5.3 and Wi-Fi 6E connectivity, HDMI 2.1, longer battery life, and up to 96 GB of memory with M2 Max models.

On October 30, 2023, Apple announced updated 14-inch and 16-inch MacBook Pro models based on the M3 series of chips. The 13-inch MacBook Pro was replaced with a base M3 14-inch MacBook Pro that featured the same design as the higher-end MacBook Pros minus one Thunderbolt port and the Space Black color.

On October 30, 2024, Apple announced updated 14-inch and 16-inch MacBook Pro models based on the M4 series of chips.

On October 15, 2025, Apple announced the updated 14-inch MacBook Pros with the Apple M5 chip.

On March 3, 2026, Apple announced the updated 14-inch and 16-inch models with the M5 Pro and M5 Max chips, increased memory and storage, and the Apple N1 networking chip with Wi-Fi 7 and Bluetooth 6.

On October 27, 2026, Apple updated the base model 14-inch MacBook Pro with the M6 chip. On October 28, the higher-end 14- and 16-inch MacBook Pro models were introduced with the M5 Pro and M5 Max chips, alongside a PROLED XDR display, based on the tandem OLED technology that was first used in the M4 iPad Pros) the Dynamic Island (replacing the notch), and for the first time includes a long-rumored touchscreen.

== Comparisons ==
Model	Processor (Apple silicon)	Graphics	Memory	Storage	Display	Peripheral connections	Battery (lithium polymer, non-removable) capacity	List price (in US$)
MacBook Neo	6-core Apple A18 Pro chip with 2 performance cores and 4 efficiency cores	5-core integrated GPU	8 GB unified memory with 60 GB/s memory bandwidth	256 GB or 512 GB SSD	13-inch LED-backlit display, 2408 × 1506 pixels at 219 ppi, 500 nits brightness, 1 billion colors, sRGB color	1× USB 3 (USB-C) port supporting charging and DisplayPort; 1× USB 2 (USB-C) port supporting charging; 3.5 mm headphone jack	36.5 Wh	$699, $649 for students
MacBook Air (13-inch, M5)	10-core Apple M5 chip with 4 super cores and 6 efficiency cores	8-core or 10-core integrated GPU	16 GB or 24 GB unified memory with 153 GB/s memory bandwidth Optional 32 GB at the time of purchase only.	512 GB or 1 TB SSD Optional 2 TB or 4 TB at the time of purchase, not upgradable after.	13.6-inch LED-backlit display, 2560 × 1664 pixels at 224 ppi, 500 nits brightness, 1 billion colors, wide color (P3), True Tone technology	2× Thunderbolt 4 (USB-C) ports supporting charging and DisplayPort; 3.5 mm headphone jack; MagSafe 3 charging port	53.8 Wh	$1,299, $1,199 for students
MacBook Air (15-inch, M5)	10-core Apple M5 chip with 4 super cores and 6 efficiency cores	10-core integrated GPU	16 GB or 24 GB unified memory with 153 GB/s memory bandwidth Optional 32 GB at the time of purchase only.	512 GB or 1 TB SSD Optional 2 TB or 4 TB at the time of purchase, not upgradable after.	15.3-inch LED-backlit display, 2880 × 1864 pixels at 224 ppi, 500 nits brightness, 1 billion colors, wide color (P3), True Tone technology	2× Thunderbolt 4 (USB-C) ports supporting charging and DisplayPort; 3.5 mm headphone jack; MagSafe 3 charging port	66.5 Wh	$1,499, $1,399 for students
MacBook Pro (14-inch, M6)	12-core Apple M6 chip with 2 super cores, 4 performance cores, and 6 efficiency cores	12-core integrated GPU	16 GB unified memory with 153 GB/s memory bandwidth; 24 GB or 32 GB unified memory with 170 GB/s memory bandwidth	1 TB, 2 TB or 4 TB SSD	14.2-inch Mini-LED backlit display, 3024 × 1964 pixels at 254 ppi, 1,000,000:1 contrast ratio, SDR brightness: up to 1000 nits (outdoor), XDR brightness: up to 1000 nits sustained full-screen, 1600 nits peak (HDR content only), 1 billion colors, wide color (P3), True Tone technology, ProMotion technology with 120 Hz adaptive refresh rate	3× Thunderbolt 4 (USB-C) ports supporting charging and DisplayPort; SDXC card slot; HDMI port; 3.5 mm headphone jack; MagSafe 3 port	72.4 Wh	$1,999, $1,899 for students
MacBook Pro (14-inch, M5 Pro or M5 Max)	15-core Apple M5 Pro chip with 5 super cores and 10 performance cores; 18-core Apple M5 Pro chip with 6 super cores and 12 performance cores; 18-core Apple M5 Max chip with 6 super cores and 12 performance cores	16-core integrated GPU (M5 Pro with 15-core CPU); 20-core integrated GPU (M5 Pro with 18-core CPU); 32-core integrated GPU (M5 Max); Optional 40-core GPU (M5 Max) available at time of purchase only.	24 GB or 48 GB unified memory with 307 GB/s memory bandwidth (M5 Pro); 36 GB unified memory with 460 GB/s memory bandwidth (M5 Max with 32-core GPU); 48 GB unified memory with 614 GB/s memory bandwidth (M5 Max with 40-core GPU); Optional 64 GB, 128 GB (M5 Max with 40-core GPU) RAM configuration available at time of purchase only	1 TB, 2 TB or 4 TB SSD Optional 8 TB SSD (M5 Max)	14.2-inch Mini-LED backlit display, 3024 × 1964 pixels at 254 ppi, 1,000,000:1 contrast ratio, SDR brightness: up to 1000 nits (outdoor), XDR brightness: up to 1000 nits sustained full-screen, 1600 nits peak (HDR content only), 1 billion colors, wide color (P3), True Tone technology, ProMotion technology with 120 Hz adaptive refresh rate	3× Thunderbolt 5 (USB-C) ports supporting charging and DisplayPort; SDXC card slot; HDMI port; 3.5 mm headphone jack; MagSafe 3 port	72.4 Wh	$2,499, $2,349 for students
MacBook Pro (16-inch, M5 Pro or M5 Max)	18-core Apple M5 Pro chip with 6 super cores and 12 performance cores; 18-core Apple M5 Max chip with 6 super cores and 12 performance cores	20-core integrated GPU (M5 Pro); 32-core or 40-core integrated GPU (M5 Max)	24 GB or 48 GB unified memory with 307 GB/s memory bandwidth (M5 Pro); 36 GB unified memory with 460 GB/s memory bandwidth (M5 Max with 32-core GPU); 48 GB unified memory with 614 GB/s memory bandwidth (M5 Max with 40-core GPU); Optional 64 GB, 128 GB (M5 Max with 40-core GPU) RAM configuration available at time of purchase only	1 TB, 2 TB or 4 TB SSD Optional 8 TB SSD (M5 Max)	16.2-inch Mini-LED backlit display, 3456 × 2234 pixels at 254 ppi, 1,000,000:1 contrast ratio, SDR brightness: up to 1000 nits (outdoor), XDR brightness: up to 1000 nits sustained full-screen, 1600 nits peak (HDR content only), 1 billion colors, wide color (P3), True Tone technology, ProMotion technology with 120 Hz adaptive refresh rate	3× Thunderbolt 5 (USB-C) ports supporting charging and DisplayPort; SDXC card slot; HDMI port; 3.5 mm headphone jack; MagSafe 3 port	99.6 Wh	$2,999, $2,799 for students
MacBook Pro (14-inch PROLED XDR, M5 Pro or M5 Max)	15-core Apple M5 Pro chip with 5 super cores and 10 performance cores; 18-core Apple M5 Pro chip with 6 super cores and 12 performance cores; 18-core Apple M5 Max chip with 6 super cores and 12 performance cores	16-core integrated GPU (M5 Pro with 15-core CPU); 20-core integrated GPU (M5 Pro with 18-core CPU); 32-core integrated GPU (M5 Max); Optional 40-core GPU (M5 Max) available at time of purchase only.	24 GB or 48 GB unified memory with 307 GB/s memory bandwidth (M5 Pro); 36 GB unified memory with 460 GB/s memory bandwidth (M5 Max with 32-core GPU); 48 GB unified memory with 614 GB/s memory bandwidth (M5 Max with 40-core GPU); Optional 64 GB, 128 GB (M5 Max with 40-core GPU) RAM configuration available at time of purchase only	1 TB, 2 TB or 4 TB SSD Optional 8 TB or 16 TB SSD (M5 Max)	14.2-inch Tandem OLED display, 3024 × 1986 pixels at 254 ppi, 10,000,000:1 contrast ratio, SDR brightness: up to 1000 nits sustained full-screen, 2000 nits peak (outdoor), XDR brightness: up to 1000 nits sustained full-screen, 2000 nits peak (HDR content only), 1 billion colors, wide color (P3 + Adobe RGB), True Tone technology, ProMotion technology with 120 Hz adaptive refresh rate	3× Thunderbolt 5 (USB-C) ports supporting charging, DisplayPort and genlock; SDXC card slot; HDMI port; 3.5 mm headphone jack; MagSafe 3 port	72.6 Wh	$2,899, $2,749 for students
MacBook Pro (16-inch PROLED XDR, M5 Pro or M5 Max)	18-core Apple M5 Pro chip with 6 super cores and 12 performance cores; 18-core Apple M5 Max chip with 6 super cores and 12 performance cores	20-core integrated GPU (M5 Pro); 32-core or 40-core integrated GPU (M5 Max)	24 GB or 48 GB unified memory with 307 GB/s memory bandwidth (M5 Pro); 36 GB unified memory with 460 GB/s memory bandwidth (M5 Max with 32-core GPU); 48 GB unified memory with 614 GB/s memory bandwidth (M5 Max with 40-core GPU); Optional 64 GB, 128 GB (M5 Max with 40-core GPU) RAM configuration available at time of purchase only	1 TB, 2 TB or 4 TB SSD Optional 8 TB or 16 TB SSD (M5 Max)	16.3-inch Tandem OLED display, 3472 × 2266 pixels at 254 ppi, 10,000,000:1 contrast ratio, SDR brightness: up to 1000 nits sustained full-screen, 2000 nits peak (outdoor), XDR brightness: up to 1000 nits sustained full-screen, 2000 nits peak (HDR content only), 1 billion colors, wide color (P3 + Adobe RGB), True Tone technology, ProMotion technology with 120 Hz adaptive refresh rate	3× Thunderbolt 5 (USB-C) ports supporting charging, DisplayPort and genlock; SDXC card slot; HDMI port; 3.5 mm headphone jack; MagSafe 3 port	99.9 Wh	$3,399, $3,199 for students

== Timeline ==
Timeline of portable Macintoshes
See also: List of Mac models

== See also ==
- MacBook Air
- MacBook Pro
